= List of Agaricales genera =

This is a list of fungal genera in the order Agaricales. The list follows Kalichman, Kirk & Matheny (2020), with more recent additions and amendments, as noted. The number of species in each family is taken from Catalogue of Life (2023) and is subject to change as new research is published. Many genera are not as yet assigned to a family and are listed under "incertae sedis".

== Genera ==
- Rows highlighted in orange contain links to separate pages with lists for families with more than forty genera.

Genus Authority	Year	Family	Type species	No. of species	Distribution
		Agaricaceae			
Amanita; Pers.	1797	Amanitaceae	Amanita muscaria (L.) Lam.	753	Worldwide
Catatrama; Franco-Mol.	1991	Amanitaceae	Catatrama costaricensis Franco-Mol.	2	Costa Rica, India
Limacella; Earle	1909	Amanitaceae	Limacella delicata (Fr.) Earle	36	Worldwide
Limacellopsis; Zhu L. Yang, Q. Cai & Y.Y. Cu	2018	Amanitaceae	Limacellopsis guttata (Pers.) Zhu L. Yang, Q. Cai & Y.Y. Cui	2	Europe, China
Saproamanita; Redhead, Vizzini, Drehmel & Contu	2016	Amanitaceae	Saproamanita vittadinii (Moretti) Redhead, Vizzini, Drehmel & Contu	24	Worldwide
Zhuliangomyces; Redhead	2019	Amanitaceae	Zhuliangomyces olivaceus (Zhu L. Yang, Y.Y. Cui & Q. Cai) Redhead	8	Worldwide
Baisuzhenia; H. Qu, Z.W. Ge, Zhu L. Yang & Redhead	2025	Baisuzheniaceae	Baisuzhenia humphreyi (Burt) H. Qu, Z.W. Ge, Zhu L. Yang & Redhead	1	eastern Asia, western North America
Bonomyces; Vizzini	2014	Biannulariaceae	Bonomyces sinopicus (Fr.) Vizzini	5	Worldwide
Catathelasma; Lovejoy	1910	Biannulariaceae	Catathelasma evanescens Lovejoy	6	Worldwide
Cleistocybe; Ammirati, A.D. Parker & Matheny	2007	Biannulariaceae	Cleistocybe vernalis Ammirati, A.D. Parker & Matheny	5	Worldwide
Bolbitius; Fr.	1838	Bolbitiaceae	Bolbitius vitellinus (Pers.) Fr.	57	Worldwide
Conocybe; Fayod	1889	Bolbitiaceae	Conocybe tenera (Schaeff.) Fayod	267	Worldwide
Descolea; Singer	1952	Bolbitiaceae	Descolea antartica Singer	24	Worldwide
Galerella; Earle	1909	Bolbitiaceae	Galerella plicatella (Peck) Singer	7	Worldwide
Pholiotina; Fayod	1889	Bolbitiaceae	Pholiotina blattaria (Fr.) Fayod	28	Worldwide
Tubariella; E. Horak & Hauskn.	2002	Bolbitiaceae	Tubariella rhizophora E.Horak & Hauskn.	1	Papua New Guinea
Broomeia; Berk.	1844	Broomeiaceae	Broomeia congregata Berk.	2	Africa, South America
Anupama; K.N.A. Raj, K.P.D. Latha & Manim.	2019	Callistosporiaceae	Anupama indica K.N.A. Raj, K.P.D. Latha & Manim.	1	India
Callistosporium; Singer	1944	Callistosporiaceae	Callistosporium palmarum (Murrill) Singer	20	Worldwide
Guyanagarika; Sánchez-García, T.W. Henkel & Aime	2016	Callistosporiaceae	Guyanagarika aurantia Sánchez-García, T.W. Henkel & Aime	3	Guyana
Macrocybe; Pegler & Lodge	1998	Callistosporiaceae	Macrocybe titans (H.E. Bigelow & Kimbr.) Pegler, Lodge & Nakasone	8	Worldwide
Pseudolaccaria; Vizzini, Contu & Z.W. Ge	2015	Callistosporiaceae	Pseudolaccaria pachyphylla (Fr.) Vizzini & Contu	2	Europe and North America
Xerophorus (Bon) Vizzini, Consiglio & M. Marchetti	2020	Callistosporiaceae	Xerophorus olivascens (Boud.) Vizzini, Consiglio & M. Marchetti	3	Europe and Caribbean
Camarophyllopsis; Herink	1958	Clavariaceae	Camarophyllopsis schulzeri (Bres.) Herink	17	Worldwide
Ceratellopsis; Konrad & Maubl.	1937	Clavariaceae	Ceratellopsis acuminata (Fuckel) Corner	2	Europe
Clavaria; Vaill. ex L.	1753	Clavariaceae	Clavaria fragilis Holmsk.	186	Worldwide
Clavicorona; Doty	1947	Clavariaceae	Clavicorona taxophila (Thom) Doty	7	Worldwide
Clavulinopsis; Overeem	1923	Clavariaceae	Clavulinopsis sulcata Overeem	68	Worldwide
Gloeomucro; R.H. Petersen	1980	Clavariaceae	Gloeomucro nodosus (Linder) R.H. Petersen	10	Worldwide
Hirticlavula; J.H. Petersen & Læssøe	2014	Clavariaceae	Hirticlavula elegans J.H. Petersen & Læssøe	1	Europe
Hodophilus; R. Heim	1958	Clavariaceae	Hodophilus foetens (W. Phillips) Birkebak & Adamčík	26	Worldwide
Hyphodontiella; Å.Strid	1975	Clavariaceae	Hyphodontiella multiseptata Å.Strid	2	Europe
Lamelloclavaria; Birkebak & Adamčík	2016	Clavariaceae	Lamelloclavaria petersenii Adamčík & Birkebak	1	Europe
Mucronella; Fr.	1874	Clavariaceae	Mucronella calva (Alb. & Schwein.) Fr.	16	Worldwide
Ramariopsis; Corner	1950	Clavariaceae	Ramariopsis kunzei (Fr.) Corner	43	Worldwide
Aureonarius; Niskanen & Liimat.	2022	Cortinariaceae	Aureonarius kroegeri (Niskanen, Liimat., E. Harrower, Berbee, Garnica & Ammirati) Niskanen & Liimat.	18	Worldwide
Austrocortinarius; Niskanen & Liimat.	2022	Cortinariaceae	Austrocortinarius victoriaensis (Liimat.) Niskanen	2	Australia
Calonarius; Niskanen & Liimat.	2022	Cortinariaceae	Calonarius typicus Liimat.	134	Worldwide
Cortinarius (Pers.) Gray	1821	Cortinariaceae	Cortinarius violaceus (L.) Gray	2633	Worldwide
Cystinarius; Niskanen & Liimat.	2022	Cortinariaceae	Cystinarius rubiginosus (Ammirati, Bojantchev, Niskanen & Liimat.) Liimat. & Niskanen	7	Worldwide
Gymnoglossum; Massee	1891	Cortinariaceae	Gymnoglossum stipitatum Massee	12	Worldwide
Hygronarius; Niskanen & Liimat.	2022	Cortinariaceae	Hygronarius renidens (Fr.) Niskanen & Liimat.	5	Worldwide
Mystinarius; Niskanen & Liimat.	2022	Cortinariaceae	Mystinarius lustrabilis (Moënne-Locc.) Niskanen & Liimat.	1	Europe
Phlegmacium (Fr.) Wünsche	1877	Cortinariaceae	Phlegmacium saginum (Fr.) Niskanen & Liimat.	253	Worldwide
Stephanopus; M.M.Moser & E. Horak	1975	Cortinariaceae	Stephanopus azureus M.M.Moser & E.Horak	5	South America
Thaxterogaster; Singer	1951	Cortinariaceae	Thaxterogaster magellanicus Singer	139	Worldwide
Volvanarius; Niskanen & Liimat.	2022	Cortinariaceae	Volvanarius chlorosplendidus (Furci, Niskanen, San-Fabian, Liimat. & Salgado Salomón) Niskanen & Liimat.	8	Worldwide
Crassisporium; Matheny, P.-A. Moreau & Vizzini	2015	Crassisporiaceae	Crassisporium funariophilum (M.M. Moser) Matheny, P.-A. Moreau & Vizzini	3	Europe, South America
Romagnesiella; Contu, Matheny, P.-A. Moreau, Vizzini & A. de Haan	2015	Crassisporiaceae	Romagnesiella clavus (Romagn.) Contu, Matheny, P.-A. Moreau, Vizzini & A. de Haan	3	Europe
Crepidotus (Fr.) Staude	1857	Crepidotaceae	Crepidotus mollis (Schaeff.) Staude	330	Worldwide
Episphaeria; Donk	1962	Crepidotaceae	Episphaeria fraxinicola (Berk. & Broome) Donk	1	Europe
Nanstelocephala; Oberw. & R.H. Petersen	1990	Crepidotaceae	Nanstelocephala physalacrioides Oberw. & R.H. Petersen	1	North America
Neopaxillus; Singer	1948	Crepidotaceae	Neopaxillus echinosporus Singer	5	South America, Sri Lanka
Phaeosolenia; Speg.	1902	Crepidotaceae	Phaeosolenia platensis Speg.	8	Worldwide
Pleuroflammula; Singer	1946	Crepidotaceae	Pleuroflammula dussii (Pat.) Singer	22	Worldwide
Simocybe; P. Karst.	1879	Crepidotaceae	Simocybe centunculus (Fr.) P. Karst.	69	Worldwide
Acanthocorticium; Baltazar, Gorjón & Rajchenb	2015	Cyphellaceae	Acanthocorticium brueggemannii Baltazar, Gorjón & Rajchenb	1	South America
Actiniceps; Berk. & Broome	1876	Cyphellaceae	Actiniceps thwaitesii Berk. & Broome	7	Africa, Asia, South America
Atheniella; Redhead, Moncalvo, Vilgalys, Desjardin & B.A. Perry	2012	Cyphellaceae	Atheniella adonis (Bull.) Redhead, Moncalvo, Vilgalys, Desjardin & B.A. Perry	10	Worldwide
Calyptella; Quél.	1886	Cyphellaceae	Calyptella capula (Holmsk.) Quél.	29	Worldwide
Campanophyllum; Cifuentes & R.H.Petersen	2003	Cyphellaceae	Campanophyllum proboscideum (Fr.) Cifuentes & R.H. Petersen	1	Central America
Cheimonophyllum; Singer	1955	Cyphellaceae	Cheimonophyllum candidissimum (Berk. & M.A.Curtis) Singer	3	Worldwide
Chondrostereum; Pouzar	1959	Cyphellaceae	Chondrostereum purpureum (Pers.) Pouzar	4	Worldwide
Cunninghammyces; Stalpers	1985	Cyphellaceae	Cunninghammyces umbonatus (G.Cunn.) Stalpers	2	New Zealand, Réunion
Cyphella; Fr.	1818	Cyphellaceae	Cyphella digitalis (Alb. & Schwein.) Fr.	64	Worldwide
Gloeocorticium; Hjortstam & Ryvarden	1986	Cyphellaceae	Gloeocorticium cinerascens Hjortstam & Ryvarden	1	Argentina
Gloeostereum; S.Ito & S.Imai	1933	Cyphellaceae	Gloeostereum incarnatum S.Ito & S.Imai	1	Japan
Granulobasidium; Jülich	1979	Cyphellaceae	Granulobasidium vellereum (Ellis & Cragin) Jülich	1	North America and Europe
Incrustocalyptella; Agerer	1983	Cyphellaceae	Incrustocalyptella columbiana Agerer	3	South America, Asia, Hawaii
Rhodoarrhenia; Singer	1964	Cyphellaceae	Rhodoarrhenia pezizoidea (Speg.) Singer	6	Worldwide
Seticyphella; Agerer	1983	Cyphellaceae	Seticyphella tenuispora Agerer	3	Europe, South America
Sphaerobasidioscypha; Agerer	1983	Cyphellaceae	Sphaerobasidioscypha citrispora Agerer	2	New Zealand, Venezuela
Thujacorticium; Ginns	1988	Cyphellaceae	Thujacorticium mirabile Ginns	2	Europe, North America
Crustomyces; Jülich	1978	Cystostereaceae	Crustomyces subabruptus (Bourdot & Galzin) Jülich	7	Worldwide
Cystidiodontia; Hjortstam	1983	Cystostereaceae	Cystidiodontia artocreas (Berk. & M.A.Curtis ex Cooke) Hjortstam	2	Asia, Americas
Cystostereum; Pouzar	1959	Cystostereaceae	Cystostereum murrayi (Berk. & M.A.Curtis) Pouzar	10	Worldwide
Parvobasidium; Jülich	1975	Cystostereaceae	Parvobasidium cretatum (Bourdot & Galzin) Jülich	2	Europe, New Zealand
Parvodontia; Hjortstam & Ryvarden	2004	Cystostereaceae	Parvodontia luteocystidia Hjortstam & Ryvarden	3	South America, China
Rigidotubus; J. Song, Y.C. Dai & B.K. Cui	2018	Cystostereaceae	Rigidotubus tephroleucus J. Song, Y.C. Dai & B.K. Cui	1	China
Clitopilus (Fr. ex Rabenh.) P.Kumm.	1871	Entolomataceae	Clitopilus prunulus (Scop.) P.Kumm.	192	Worldwide
Entoloma (Fr.) P.Kumm.	1871	Entolomataceae	Entoloma sinuatum (Bull.) P. Kumm.	1948	Worldwide
Fistulina; Bull.	1791	Fistulinaceae	Fistulina hepatica (Schaeff.) With.	11	Worldwide
Porodisculus; Murrill	1907	Fistulinaceae	Porodisculus pendulus (Fr.) Murrill	2	Asia, Americas
Pseudofistulina; O.Fidalgo & M.Fidalgo	1963	Fistulinaceae	Pseudofistulina brasiliensis (O.Fidalgo & M.Fidalgo) O.Fidalgo & M.Fidalgo	3	Asia, Americas
Panaeolus (Fr.) Quél.	1872	Galeropsidaceae	Panaeolus papilionaceus (Bull.) Quél.	82	Worldwide
Hemigaster; Juel	1895	Hemigasteraceae	Hemigaster candidus Juel	1	Sweden
Hydnangium; Wallr.	1839	Hydnangiaceae	Hydnangium carneum Wallr.	12	Worldwide
Laccaria; Berk. & Broome	1883	Hydnangiaceae	Laccaria laccata (Scop.) Cooke	92	Worldwide
Podohydnangium; G.W. Beaton, Pegler & T.W.K. Young	1984	Hydnangiaceae	Podohydnangium australe G.W. Beaton, Pegler & T.W.K. Young	1	Australia
Acantholichen; P.M.Jørg.	1998	Hygrophoraceae	Acantholichen pannarioides P.M.Jørg.	7	Central and South America
Ampulloclitocybe; Redhead, Lutzoni, Moncalvo & Vilgalys	2002	Hygrophoraceae	Ampulloclitocybe clavipes (Pers.) Redhead, Lutzoni, Moncalvo & Vilgalys	3	North temperate
Arrhenia; Fr.	1849	Hygrophoraceae	Arrhenia auriscalpium (Fr.) Fr.	67	Worldwide
Cantharellula; Singer	1936	Hygrophoraceae	Cantharellula umbonata (J.F. Gmel.) Singer	7	Worldwide
Cantharocybe; H.E. Bigelow & A.H.Sm.	1973	Hygrophoraceae	Cantharocybe gruberi (A.H.Sm.) H.E.Bigelow & A.H.Sm.	4	North and Central America, Asia
Chromosera; Redhead, Ammirati & Norvell	1995	Hygrophoraceae	Chromosera cyanophylla (Fr.) Redhead, Ammirati & Norvell	6	Europe, North America
Chrysomphalina; Clémençon	1982	Hygrophoraceae	Chrysomphalina chrysophylla (Fr.) Clémençon	3	Europe, North America
Cora; Fr.	1838	Hygrophoraceae	Cora pavonia (Sw.) Fr.	98	Africa, Central and South America
Corella; Vain.	1890	Hygrophoraceae	Corella brasiliensis Vain.	2	Central and South America
Cuphophyllus (Donk) Bon	1985	Hygrophoraceae	Cuphophyllus pratensis (Fr.) Bon	33	Worldwide
Cyphellostereum; D.A. Reid	1965	Hygrophoraceae	Cyphellostereum pusiolum (Berk. & M.A.Curtis) D.A. Reid	12	Worldwide
Dictyonema; C. Agardh ex Kunth	1822	Hygrophoraceae	Dictyonema excentricum C. Agardh ex Kunth	38	Worldwide
Eonema; Redhead, Lücking & Lawrey	2009	Hygrophoraceae	Eonema pyriforme (M.P. Christ.) Redhead, Lücking & Lawrey	1	Europe
Gliophorus; Herink	1958	Hygrophoraceae	Gliophorus psittacinus (Schaeff.) Herink	15	Worldwide
Gloioxanthomyces; Lodge, Vizzini, Ercole & Boertm.	2013	Hygrophoraceae	Gloioxanthomyces vitellinus (Fr.) Lodge, Vizzini, Ercole & Boertm.	2	Europe and North America
Haasiella; Kotl. & Pouzar	1966	Hygrophoraceae	Haasiella splendidissima Kotl. & Pouzar	1	Europe
Humidicutis (Singer) Singer	1959	Hygrophoraceae	Humidicutis marginata (Peck) Singer	20	Worldwide
Hygroaster; Singer	1955	Hygrophoraceae	Hygroaster nodulisporus (Dennis) Ralaiv., Niskanen & Liimat	10	Worldwide
Hygrocybe (Fr.) P.Kumm.	1871	Hygrophoraceae	Hygrocybe conica (Schaeff.) P.Kumm.	360	Worldwide
Hygrophorus; Fr.	1836	Hygrophoraceae	Hygrophorus eburneus (Bull.) Fr.	275	Worldwide
Lichenomphalia; Redhead, Lutzoni, Moncalvo & Vilgalys	2002	Hygrophoraceae	Lichenomphalia hudsoniana (H.S.Jenn.) Redhead, Lutzoni, Moncalvo & Vilgalys	15	Worldwide
Melanomphalia; M.P. Christ.	1936	Hygrophoraceae	Melanomphalia nigrescens M.P. Christ.	1	Europe
Neohygrocybe; Herink	1958	Hygrophoraceae	Neohygrocybe ovina (Bull.) Herink	8	Worldwide
Porpolomopsis; Bresinsky	2008	Hygrophoraceae	Porpolomopsis calyptriformis (Berk.) Bresinsky	2	Australia, Europe
Pseudoarmillariella (Singer) Singer	1956	Hygrophoraceae	Pseudoarmillariella ectypoides (Peck) Singer	3	Worldwide
Semiomphalina; Redhead	1984	Hygrophoraceae	Semiomphalina leptoglossoides (Corner) Redhead	1	Papua New Guinea
Sinohygrocybe; C.Q. Wang, Ming Zhang & T.H. Li	2018	Hygrophoraceae	Sinohygrocybe tomentosipes C.Q. Wang, Ming Zhang & T.H. Li	1	China
Spodocybe; Z.M. He & Zhu L. Yang	2021	Hygrophoraceae	Spodocybe rugosiceps Z.M. He & Zhu L. Yang	8	Worldwide
Alnicola; Kühner	1926	Hymenogastraceae	Alnicola luteolofibrillosa Kühner	14	Worldwide
Hebeloma (Fr.) P. Kumm.	1871	Hymenogastraceae	Hebeloma fastibile (Pers.) P. Kumm.	354	Worldwide
Hymenogaster; Vittad.	1831	Hymenogastraceae	Hymenogaster citrinus Vittad.	74	Worldwide
Psathyloma; Soop, J.A. Cooper & Dima	1984	Hymenogastraceae	Psathyloma leucocarpum Soop, J.A. Cooper & Dima	3	Argentina, New Zealand
Auritella; Matheny & Bougher	2006	Inocybaceae	Auritella dolichocystis Matheny, Trappe & Bougher ex Matheny & Bougher	13	Africa, Asia, Australia
Inocybe (Fr.) Fr.	1836	Inocybaceae	Inocybe relicina (Fr.) Quél.	1120	Worldwide
Inosperma (Kühner) Matheny & Esteve-Rav.	2019	Inocybaceae	Inosperma calamistratum (Fr.) Matheny & Esteve-Rav.	78	Worldwide
Mallocybe (Kuyper) Matheny, Vizzini & Esteve-Rav.	2019	Inocybaceae	Mallocybe terrigena (Fr.) Matheny, Vizzini & Esteve-Rav.	61	Worldwide
Nothocybe; Matheny & K.P.D. Latha	2019	Inocybaceae	Nothocybe distincta (K.P.D. Latha & Manim.) Matheny & K.P.D. Latha	1	India
Pseudosperma; Matheny & Esteve-Rav	2019	Inocybaceae	Pseudosperma sororium (Kauffman) Matheny & Esteve-Rav.	97	Worldwide
Tubariomyces; Esteve-Rav. & Matheny	2010	Inocybaceae	Tubariomyces inexpectatus (M. Villarreal, Esteve-Rav., Heykoop & E. Horak) Esteve-Rav. & Matheny	4	Worldwide
Limnoperdon; G.A.Escobar	1976	Limnoperdaceae	Limnoperdon incarnatum G.A.Escobar	1	USA, Japan, South Africa, Europe
Abstoma; G.Cunn.	1926	Lycoperdaceae	Abstoma purpureum (Lloyd) G.Cunn.	9	Worldwide
Acutocapillitium; P.Ponce de León	1976	Lycoperdaceae	Acutocapillitium torrendii (Lloyd) P.Ponce de León	3	Europe, South America
Arachnion; Schwein.	1822	Lycoperdaceae	Arachnion album Schwein.	11	Worldwide
Bovista; Pers.	1794	Lycoperdaceae	Bovista plumbea Pers.	100	Worldwide
Bovistella; Morgan	1892	Lycoperdaceae	Bovistella ohiensis (Ellis & Morgan) Morgan	20	Worldwide
Calbovista; Morse ex M.T.Seidl	1995	Lycoperdaceae	Calbovista subsculpta <Morse ex M.T.Seidl<	1	North America
Calvatia; Fr.	1849	Lycoperdaceae	Calvatia craniiformis <(Schwein.) Fr. ex De Toni	67	Worldwide
Disciseda; Czern.	1845	Lycoperdaceae	Disciseda collabescens Czern.	38	Worldwide
Gastropila; Homrich & J.E.Wright	1973	Lycoperdaceae	Gastropila fragilis (Lév.) Homrich & J.E.Wright	4	North and South America
Glyptoderma; R.Heim & Perr.-Bertr.	1971	Lycoperdaceae	Glyptoderma coelatum (Pat. ex R.Heim) R.Heim & Perr.-Bertr.	1	Guadeloupe
Holocotylon; Lloyd	1906	Lycoperdaceae	Holocotylon brandegeeanum Lloyd	3	North America
Lycoperdon; Pers.	1801	Lycoperdaceae	Lycoperdon perlatum Pers.	188	Worldwide
Lycoperdopsis; Henn.	1900	Lycoperdaceae	Lycoperdopsis arcyrioides Henn. & E.Nyman	1	Java
Morganella; Zeller	1948	Lycoperdaceae	Morganella mexicana Zeller	8	Worldwide
Mycenastrum; Desv.	1842	Lycoperdaceae	Mycenastrum corium (Guers.) Desv.	3	Worldwide
Vascellum; F.Šmarda	1958	Lycoperdaceae	Vascellum depressum (Bonord.) F.Šmarda	8	Worldwide
Arthromyces; T.J. Baroni & Lodge	2007	Lyophyllaceae	Arthromyces claviformis T.J. Baroni & Lodge	3	Central and South America
Asterophora; Ditmar	1809	Lyophyllaceae	Asterophora lycoperdoides (Bull.) Ditmar	4	Worldwide
Atractosporocybe; P. Alvarado, G. Moreno & Vizzini	2015	Lyophyllaceae	Atractosporocybe inornata (Sowerby) P. Alvarado, G. Moreno & Vizzini	3	Europe
Blastosporella; T.J.Baroni & Franco-Mol.	2007	Lyophyllaceae	Blastosporella zonata T.J.Baroni & Franco-Mol.	1	Colombia
Calocybe; Kühner ex Donk	1962	Lyophyllaceae	Calocybe gambosa (Fr.) Donk	56	Worldwide
Calocybella; Vizzini, Consiglio & Setti	2015	Lyophyllaceae	Calocybella pudica (Bon & Contu) Vizzini, Consiglio & Setti	8	Worldwide
Clitolyophyllum; Seslı, Vizzini & Contu	2016	Lyophyllaceae	Clitolyophyllum akcaabatense Seslı, Vizzini & Contu	2	Asia
Gerhardtia; Bon	1994	Lyophyllaceae	Gerhardtia incarnatobrunnea (Ew. Gerhardt) Bon	13	Worldwide
Hypsizygus; Singer	1947	Lyophyllaceae	Hypsizygus tessulatus (Bull.) Singer	5	Northern hemisphere
Leucocybe; Vizzini, P. Alvarado, G. Moreno & Consiglio	2015	Lyophyllaceae	Leucocybe candicans (Pers.) Vizzini, P. Alvarado, G. Moreno & Consiglio	3	Europe
Lyophyllopsis; Sathe & J.T.Daniel	1981	Lyophyllaceae	Lyophyllopsis keralensis Sathe & J.T.Daniel	1	India
Lyophyllum; P.Karst.	1881	Lyophyllaceae	Lyophyllum leucophaeatum (P.Karst.) P.Karst.	115	Worldwide
Myochromella; V. Hofst., Clémençon, Moncalvo & Redhead	2015	Lyophyllaceae	Myochromella inolens (Fr.) V. Hofst., Clémençon, Moncalvo & Redhead	2	Europe
Ossicaulis; Redhead & Ginns	1985	Lyophyllaceae	Ossicaulis lignatilis (Pers.) Redhead & Ginns	3	Europe and Asia
Rhizocybe; Vizzini, G. Moreno, P. Alvarado & Consiglio	2015	Lyophyllaceae	Rhizocybe vermicularis (Fr.) Vizzini, P. Alvarado, G. Moreno & Consiglio	5	Worldwide
Sagaranella; V. Hofst., Clémençon, Moncalvo & Redhead	2015	Lyophyllaceae	Sagaranella tylicolor (Fr.) V. Hofst., Clémençon, Moncalvo & Redhead	4	Europe
Sphagnurus; Redhead & V. Hofst.	2014	Lyophyllaceae	Sphagnurus paluster (Peck) Redhead & V. Hofst.	1	North America
Tephrocybe; Donk	1962	Lyophyllaceae	Tephrocybe rancida (Fr.) Donk	31	Worldwide
Tephrocybella; Picillo, Vizzini & Contu	2015	Lyophyllaceae	Tephrocybella griseonigrescens Picillo, Vizzini & Contu	2	Italy
Tephroderma; Contu & Musumeci	2014	Lyophyllaceae	Tephroderma fuscopallens Musumeci & Contu	1	France
Termitomyces; R.Heim	1942	Lyophyllaceae	Termitomyces striatus (Beeli) R.Heim	52	Worldwide
Tricholomella; Zerova ex Kalamees	1992	Lyophyllaceae	Tricholomella constricta (Fr.) Zerova ex Kalamees	1	Asia and Europe
Tricholyophyllum; Qing Cai, G. Kost & Zhu L. Yang	2020	Lyophyllaceae	Tricholyophyllum brunneum Qing Cai, G. Kost & Zhu L. Yang	1	China
Macrocystidia; Joss.	1934	Macrocystidiaceae	Macrocystidia cucumis (Pers.) Joss.	6	Worldwide
		Marasmiaceae			
Cruentomycena; R.H. Petersen, Kovalenko & O.V. Morozova	2008	Mycenaceae	Cruentomycena viscidocruenta (Cleland) R.H. Petersen & Kovalenko	5	Asia, Australia
Favolaschia (Pat.) Pat.	1895	Mycenaceae	Favolaschia gaillardii (Pat.) Pat.	91	Worldwide
Flabellimycena; Redhead	1984	Mycenaceae	Flabellimycena flava (Singer) Redhead	1	South America
Mycena (Pers.) Roussel	1806	Mycenaceae	Mycena galericulata (Scop.) Gray	1350	Worldwide
Panellus; P.Karst.	1879	Mycenaceae	Panellus stipticus (Bull.) P.Karst.	64	Worldwide
Poromycena; Overeem	1926	Mycenaceae	Poromycena decipiens Overeem	3	South America, Papua New Guinea
Protomycena (Note: These are fossil fungi.); Hibbett, D. Grimaldi & Donoghue	1997	Mycenaceae	Protomycena electra Hibbett, D. Grimaldi & Donoghue	1	Extinct; Dominican amber
Resinomycena; Redhead & Singer	1981	Mycenaceae	Resinomycena rhododendri (Peck) Redhead & Singer	12	Worldwide
Roridomyces; Rexer	1994	Mycenaceae	Roridomyces roridus (Fr.) Rexer	15	Worldwide
Mythicomyces; Redhead & A.H.Sm.	1986	Mythicomycetaceae	Mythicomyces corneipes (Fr.) Redhead & A.H.Sm.	1	Northern hemisphere
Stagnicola; Redhead & A.H.Sm.	1986	Mythicomycetaceae	Stagnicola perplexa (P.D. Orton) Redhead & A.H.Sm.	1	Europe
Calathella; D.A. Reid	1964	Niaceae	Calathella eruciformis (P. Micheli ex Batsch) D.A. Reid	7	Worldwide
Dendrothele; Höhn. & Litsch.	1907	Niaceae	Dendrothele papillosa Höhn. & Litsch.	63	Worldwide
Digitatispora; Doguet	1962	Niaceae	Digitatispora marina Doguet	2	Northern hemisphere
Flagelloscypha; Donk	1951	Niaceae	Flagelloscypha minutissima (Burt) Donk	37	Worldwide
Halocyphina; Kohlm. & E. Kohlm.	1965	Niaceae	Halocyphina villosa Kohlm. & E. Kohlm.	1	United States
Lachnella; Fr.	1836	Niaceae	Lachnella alboviolascens (Alb. & Schwein.) Fr.	92	Worldwide
Maireina; W.B. Cooke	1961	Niaceae	Maireina monacha (Speg.) W.B. Cooke	21	Worldwide
Merismodes; Earle	1909	Niaceae	Merismodes fasciculata (Schwein.) Earle	7	Worldwide
Nia; R.T. Moore & Meyers	1961	Niaceae	Nia vibrissa R.T. Moore & Meyers	3	Northern Hemisphere
Sphaerobasidioscypha; Agerer	1983	Niaceae	Sphaerobasidioscypha citrispora Agerer	2	Venezuela, New Zealand
Woldmaria; W.B.Cooke	1962	Niaceae	Woldmaria crocea (P.Karst.) W.B.Cooke	1	Europe, North America
Crucibulum; Tul. & C. Tul.	1844	Nidulariaceae	Crucibulum vulgare Tul. & C. Tul.	6	Worldwide
Cyathus; Haller	1768	Nidulariaceae	Cyathus striatus Willd.	99	Worldwide
Mycocalia; J.T. Palmer	1961	Nidulariaceae	Mycocalia denudata (Fr.) J.T. Palmer	5	Europe
Nidula; V.S. White	1902	Nidulariaceae	Nidula candida (Peck) V.S. White	7	Worldwide
Nidularia; Fr.	1817	Nidulariaceae	Nidularia radicata Fr. & Nordholm	9	Worldwide
Retiperidiolia; Kraisit., Choeyklin, Boonprat. & M.E. Sm.	2022	Nidulariaceae	Retiperidiolia reticulata (Petch) Kraisit., Choeyklin, Boonprat. & M.E. Sm.	2	Asia & South America
Anthracophyllum; Ces.	1879	Omphalotaceae	Anthracophyllum beccarianum Ces.	12	Tropical Asia and America
Brunneocorticium; Sheng H.Wu	2007	Omphalotaceae	Brunneocorticium pyriforme Sheng H.Wu	2	Taiwan, South America
Connopus; R.H.Petersen	2010	Omphalotaceae	Connopus acervatus (Fr.) R.H.Petersen	1	Europe, North America
Gymnopus (Pers.) Roussel	1806	Omphalotaceae	Gymnopus fusipes (Bull.) Gray	218	Worldwide
Lentinula; Earle	1909	Omphalotaceae	Lentinula cubensis (Berk. & M.A.Curtis) Earle	10	East Asia, North and Central America
Marasmiellus; Murrill	1915	Omphalotaceae	Marasmiellus juniperinus Murrill	288	Worldwide
Mycetinis; Earle	1909	Omphalotaceae	Mycetinis alliaceus (Jacq.) Earle	16	Worldwide
Neonothopanus; R.H.Petersen & Krisai	1999	Omphalotaceae	Neonothopanus nambi (Speg.) R.H.Petersen & Krisai	4	South America & Africa
Omphalotus; Fayod	1889	Omphalotaceae	Omphalotus olearius (DC.) Singer	10	Worldwide
Rhodocollybia; Singer	1939	Omphalotaceae	Rhodocollybia maculata (Alb. & Schwein.) Singer	36	Worldwide
Dictyocephalos; Underw.	1901	Phelloriniaceae	Dictyocephalos curvatus Underw.	1	
Phellorinia; Berk.	1843	Phelloriniaceae	Phellorinia inquinans Berk.	2	
Macrotyphula; R.H.Petersen	1972	Phyllotopsidaceae	Macrotyphula fistulosa (Holmsk.) R.H.Petersen	6	
Phyllotopsis; E.-J.Gilbert & Donk ex Singer	1936	Phyllotopsidaceae	Phyllotopsis nidulans (Pers.) Singer	5	
Pleurocybella; Singer	1947	Phyllotopsidaceae	Pleurocybella porrigens (Pers.) Singer	6	Worldwide
Armillaria (Fr.) Staude	1857	Physalacriaceae	Armillaria mellea (Vahl) P. Kumm.	74	Worldwide
Cibaomyces; Zhu L. Yang, Y.J. Hao & J. Qin	2014	Physalacriaceae	Cibaomyces glutinis Zhu L. Yang, Y.J. Hao & J. Qin	1	China
Cryptomarasmius; T.S. Jenkinson & Desjardin	2014	Physalacriaceae	Cryptomarasmius corbariensis (Roum.) T.S. Jenkinson & Desjardin	15	
Cylindrobasidium; Jülich	1974	Physalacriaceae	Cylindrobasidium evolvens (Fr.) Jülich	12	Worldwide
Cyptotrama; Singer	1960	Physalacriaceae	Cyptotrama macrobasidium Singer	21	Worldwide
Dactylosporina (Clémençon) Dörfelt	1985	Physalacriaceae	Dactylosporina steffenii (Rick) Dörfelt	5	Worldwide
Desarmillaria (Herink) R.A. Koch & Aime	2017	Physalacriaceae	Desarmillaria tabescens (Scop.) R.A. Koch & Aime	3	North temperate
Flammulina; P. Karst.	1891	Physalacriaceae	Flammulina velutipes (Curtis) Singer	31	Worldwide
Gloiocephala; Massee	1892	Physalacriaceae	Gloiocephala epiphylla Massee	44	
Guyanagaster; T.W. Henkel, M.E. Sm. & Aime	2010	Physalacriaceae	Guyanagaster necrorhizus T.W. Henkel, Aime & M.E. Sm.	2	Guyana
Hymenopellis; R.H. Petersen	2010	Physalacriaceae	Hymenopellis radicata (Relhan) R.H. Petersen	41	Worldwide
Laccariopsis; Vizzini	2013	Physalacriaceae	Laccariopsis mediterranea (Pacioni & Lalli) Vizzini	1	Europe
Mucidula; Pat.	1887	Physalacriaceae	Mucidula mucida (Schrad.) Pat.	2	Europe
Mycaureola; Maire & Chemin	1922	Physalacriaceae	Mycaureola dilseae Maire & Chemin	1	Europe
Mycotribulus; Nag Raj & W.B. Kendr.	1970	Physalacriaceae	Mycotribulus mirabilis Nag Raj & W.B. Kendr.	2	Asia
Naiadolina; Redhead, Labbé & Ginns	2013	Physalacriaceae	Naiadolina flavomerulina (Redhead) Redhead, H. Labbé & Ginns	1	Canada
Oudemansiella; Speg.	1881	Physalacriaceae	Oudemansiella platensis Speg.	33	Worldwide
Paraxerula; R.H. Petersen	2010	Physalacriaceae	Paraxerula americana (Dörfelt) R.H. Petersen	4	North temperate
Physalacria; Peck	1882	Physalacriaceae	Physalacria inflata (Fr.) Peck	37	Worldwide
Ponticulomyces; R.H. Petersen	2010	Physalacriaceae	Ponticulomyces kedrovayae R.H. Petersen	2	Asia
Protoxerula; R.H. Petersen	2010	Physalacriaceae	Protoxerula flavo-olivacea (R.H. Petersen & Halling) R.H. Petersen	1	Australia
Pseudohiatula (Singer) Singer	1938	Physalacriaceae	Pseudohiatula cyatheae Singer	5	Worldwide
Rhizomarasmius; R.H. Petersen	2000	Physalacriaceae	Rhizomarasmius pyrrhocephalus (Berk.) R.H. Petersen	5	Worldwide
Rhodotus; Maire	1926	Physalacriaceae	Rhodotus palmatus (Bull.) Maire	2	North temperate
Strobilurus; Singer	1962	Physalacriaceae	Strobilurus conigenoides (Ellis) Singer	16	Worldwide
Xerula; Maire	1933	Physalacriaceae	Xerula longipes (Roussel) Maire	11	Worldwide
Hohenbuehelia; Schulzer	1866	Pleurotaceae	Hohenbuehelia petaloides (Bull.) Schulzer	126	Worldwide
Pleurotus (Fr.) P.Kumm.	1871	Pleurotaceae	Pleurotus ostreatus (Jacq.) P.Kumm.	203	Worldwide
Pluteus; Fr.	1836	Pluteaceae	Pluteus cervinus (Schaeff.) P.Kumm.	417	Worldwide
Volvopluteus; Vizzini, Contu & Justo	2011	Pluteaceae	Volvopluteus gloiocephalus (DC.) Vizzini, Contu & Justo	6	Worldwide
Chrysomycena; Vizzini, Picillo, L. Perrone & Dovana	2019	Porotheleaceae	Chrysomycena perplexa Picillo, Vizzini & L. Perrone	2	Europe
Clitocybula (Singer) Singer ex Métrod	1952	Porotheleaceae	Clitocybula lacerata (Scop.) Métrod	20	Worldwide
Delicatula; Fayod	1889	Porotheleaceae	Delicatula integrella (Pers.) Fayod	2	North temperate
Gerronema; Singer	1951	Porotheleaceae	Gerronema melanomphax Singer	64	Worldwide
Hydropodia; Vizzini & Consiglio	2022	Porotheleaceae	Hydropodia subalpina (Höhn.) Vizzini, Consiglio & M. Marchetti	1	Europe
Hydropus; Kühner ex Singer	1948	Porotheleaceae	Hydropus fuliginarius (Batsch) Singer	139	Worldwide
Leucoinocybe; Singer ex Antonín, Borovička, Holec & Kolařík	2019	Porotheleaceae	Leucoinocybe lenta (Maire) Antonín, Borovička, Holec & Kolařík	4	Europe & India
Megacollybia; Kotl. & Pouzar	1972	Porotheleaceae	Megacollybia platyphylla (Pers.) Kotl. & Pouzar	10	Worldwide
Porotheleum; Fr.	1818	Porotheleaceae	Porotheleum fimbriatum (Pers.) Fr.	12	Worldwide
Pseudohydropus; Vizzini & Consiglio	2022	Porotheleaceae	Pseudohydropus floccipes (Fr.) Vizzini & Consiglio	4	Worldwide
Pulverulina; Matheny & K.W. Hughes	2020	Porotheleaceae	Pulverulina ulmicola (H.E. Bigelow) Matheny & K.W. Hughes	1	North America
Trogia; Fr.	1836	Porotheleaceae	Trogia aplorutis (Mont.) Fr.	75	Tropica & subtropics
Albocoprinus; Voto	2020	Psathyrellaceae	Albocoprinus ealaensis (Beeli) Voto	1	Congo
Britzelmayria; D. Wächt. & A. Melzer	2020	Psathyrellaceae	Britzelmayria supernula (Britzelm.) D. Wächt. & A. Melzer	2	North temperate
Candolleomyces; D. Wächt. & A. Melzer	2020	Psathyrellaceae	Candolleomyces candolleanus (Fr.) D. Wächt. & A. Melzer	34	Worldwide
Coprinellus; P.Karst.	1879	Psathyrellaceae	Coprinellus deliquescens (Bull.) P.Karst.	64	Worldwide
Coprinopsis; P.Karst.	1881	Psathyrellaceae	Coprinopsis friesii (Quél.) P.Karst.	200	Worldwide
Cystoagaricus; Singer	1947	Psathyrellaceae	Cystoagaricus strobilomyces (Murrill) Singer	11	Worldwide
Hausknechtia; D. Wächt. & A. Melzer	2020	Psathyrellaceae	Hausknechtia floriformis (Hauskn.) D. Wächt. & A. Melzer	2	Asia and Pacific Islands
Heteropsathyrella; T. Bau & J.Q. Yan	2021	Psathyrellaceae	Heteropsathyrella macrocystidia T. Bau & J.Q. Yan	1	China
Homophron (Britzelm.) Örstadius & E. Larss.	2015	Psathyrellaceae	Homophron spadiceum (P. Kumm.) Örstadius & E. Larss	8	North temperate
Jugisporipsathyra; J.Q. Yan, Y.G. Fan & S.N. Wang	2022	Psathyrellaceae	Jugisporipsathyra reticulopilea J.Q. Yan, Y.G. Fan & S.N. Wang	1	China
Kauffmania; Örstadius & E. Larss.	2015	Psathyrellaceae	Kauffmania larga (Kauffman) Örstadius & E. Larss.	1	North America
Lacrymaria; Pat.	1887	Psathyrellaceae	Lacrymaria lacrymabunda (Bull.) Pat.	17	
Narcissea; D. Wächt. & A. Melzer	2020	Psathyrellaceae	Narcissea patouillardii (Quél.) D. Wächt. & A. Melzer	5	
Olotia; D. Wächt. & A. Melzer	2020	Psathyrellaceae	Olotia codinae (Deschuyteneer, A. Melzer & Pérez-De-Greg.) D. Wächt. & A. Melzer	1	Spain
Palaeocybe; Dörfelt & Striebich	2000	Psathyrellaceae	Palaeocybe striata Dörfelt & Striebich	1	Extinct, Germany
Parasola; Redhead, Vilgalys & Hopple	2001	Psathyrellaceae	Parasola plicatilis (Curtis) Redhead, Vilgalys & Hopple	39	Worldwide
Psathyrella (Fr.) Quél.	1872	Psathyrellaceae	Psathyrella gracilis (Fr.) Quél.	670	Worldwide
Punjabia; D. Wächt. & A. Melzer	2020	Psathyrellaceae	Punjabia pakistanica (Usman & Khalid) D. Wächt. & A. Melzer	1	Pakistan
Tulosesus; D. Wächt. & A. Melzer	2020	Psathyrellaceae	Tulosesus callinus (M. Lange & A.H. Sm.) D. Wächt. & A. Melzer	40	Worldwide
Typhrasa; Örstadius & E. Larss.	2015	Psathyrellaceae	Typhrasa gossypina (Bull.) Örstadius & E. Larss.	5	North temperate
Clitopaxillus; G. Moreno, Vizzini, Consiglio & P. Alvarado	2018	Pseudoclitocybaceae	Clitopaxillus alexandri (Gillet) G. Moreno, Vizzini, Consiglio & P. Alvarado	3	Europe & Asia
Harmajaea; Dima, P. Alvarado & Kekki	2018	Pseudoclitocybaceae	Harmajaea harperi (Murrill) Dima & P. Alvarado	3	North temperate
Musumecia; Vizzini & Contu	2011	Pseudoclitocybaceae	Musumecia bettlachensis Henn.	4	Europe & Asia
Pogonoloma (Singer) Sánchez-García	2014	Pseudoclitocybaceae	Pogonoloma spinulosum (Kühner & Romagn.) Sánchez-García	2	
Pseudoclitocybe (Singer) Singer	1956	Pseudoclitocybaceae	Pseudoclitocybe cyathiformis (Bull.) Singer	15	Worldwide
Allantula; Corner	1952	Pterulaceae	Allantula diffusa Corner	1	Brazil
Coronicium; J. Erikss. & Ryvarden	1975	Pterulaceae	Coronicium gemmiferum (Bourdot & Galzin) J. Erikss. & Ryvarden	5	
Merulicium; J. Erikss. & Ryvarden	1976	Pterulaceae	Merulicium fusisporum (Romell) J. Erikss. & Ryvarden	1	Northern Europe
Myrmecopterula; Leal-Dutra, Dentinger & G.W. Griff.	2020	Pterulaceae	Myrmecopterula moniliformis (Henn.) Leal-Dutra, Dentinger & G.W. Griff.	3	South America
Phaeopterula; Henn.	1905	Pterulaceae	Phaeopterula hirsuta Henn.	5	Africa, South America
Pterula; Fr.	1832	Pterulaceae	Pterula plumosa (Schwein.) Fr.	65	Worldwide
Pterulicium; Corner	1950	Pterulaceae	Pterulicium xylogenum (Berk. & Broome)	1	South-East Asia
Aphanobasidium; Jülich	1979	Radulomycetaceae	Aphanobasidium subnitens (Bourdot & Galzin) Jülich	15	
Radulomyces; M.P. Christ.	1960	Radulomycetaceae	Radulomyces confluens (Fr.) M.P. Christ.	10	
Radulotubus; Y.C. Dai, S.H. He & C.L. Zhao	2016	Radulomycetaceae	Radulotubus resupinatus Y.C. Dai, S.H. He & C.L. Zhao	1	China
Auriculariopsis; Maire	1902	Schizophyllaceae	Auriculariopsis ampla (Lév.) Maire	5	
Schizophyllum; Fr.	1815	Schizophyllaceae	Schizophyllum commune Fr.	6	Worldwide
Cystoderma; Fayod	1889	Squamanitaceae	Cystoderma amianthinum (Scop.) Fayod	40	Worldwide
Dissoderma (A.H. Sm. & Singer) Singer	1973	Squamanitaceae	Dissoderma paradoxum (A.H. Sm. & Singer) Singer	8	Worldwide
Floccularia; Pouzar	1957	Squamanitaceae	Floccularia straminea (Krombh.) Pouzar	5	Worldwide
Leucopholiota (Romagn.) O.K.Mill., T.J.Volk & Bessette	1996	Squamanitaceae	Leucopholiota decorosa (Peck) O.K.Mill., T.J.Volk & A.E.Bessette	2	North temperate
Phaeolepiota; Maire ex Konrad & Maubl.	1928	Squamanitaceae	Phaeolepiota aurea (Matt.) Maire	1	North temperate
Squamanita; Imbach	1946	Squamanitaceae	Squamanita schreieri Imbach	13	Worldwide
Athelidium; Oberw.	1966	Stephanosporaceae	Athelidium aurantiacum (M.P. Christ.) Oberw.	2	Europe
Cristinia; Parmasto	1968	Stephanosporaceae	Cristinia helvetica (Pers.) Parmasto	12	Worldwide
Lindtneria; Pilát	1938	Stephanosporaceae	Lindtneria trachyspora (Bourdot & Galzin) Pilát	10	Worldwide
Mayamontana; Castellano, Trappe & Lodge	2007	Stephanosporaceae	Mayamontana coccolobae Castellano, Trappe & Lodge	1	Belize
Myriococcum; Fr.	1823	Stephanosporaceae	Myriococcum praecox Fr.	1	Europe
Stephanospora; Pat.	1914	Stephanosporaceae	Stephanospora caroticolor (Berk.) Pat.	17	Worldwide
Bogbodia; Redhead	2013	Strophariaceae	Bogbodia uda (Pers.) Redhead	1	North temperate
Clavogaster; Henn.	1896	Strophariaceae	Clavogaster novozelandicus Henn.	2	New Zealand
Hypholoma (Fr.) P. Kumm.	1871	Strophariaceae	Hypholoma fasciculare (Huds.) P. Kumm.	44	Worldwide
Leratiomyces; Bresinsky & Manfr.Binder ex Bridge, Spooner, Beever & D.C.Park	2008	Strophariaceae	Leratiomyces similis (Pat. ex Sacc. & Trotter) Bresinsky & Manfr. Binder ex Redhead & McNeill	12	Worldwide
Phaeonematoloma (Singer) Bon	1994	Strophariaceae	Phaeonematoloma myosotis (Fr.) Bon	2	North temperate
Pholiota (Fr.) P. Kumm.	1871	Strophariaceae	Pholiota squarrosa (Vahl) P. Kumm.	368	Worldwide
Protostropharia; Redhead, Moncalvo & Vilgalys	2013	Strophariaceae	Protostropharia semiglobata (Batsch) Redhead, Moncalvo & Vilgalys	8	Worldwide
Pyrrhulomyces; E.J. Tian & Matheny	2020	Strophariaceae	Pyrrhulomyces astragalinus (Fr.) E.J. Tian & Matheny	2	Worldwide
Stropharia (Fr.) Quél.	1872	Strophariaceae	Stropharia aeruginosa (Curtis) Quél.	67	Worldwide
		Tricholomataceae			
Flammulaster; Earle	1909	Tubariaceae	Flammulaster carpophilus (Fr.) Earle ex Vellinga	21	Worldwide
Pachylepyrium; Singer	1958	Tubariaceae	Pachylepyrium fulvidula (Singer) Singer	2	North and South America
Phaeomarasmius; Scherff.	1897	Tubariaceae	Phaeomarasmius excentricus Scherff.	44	Worldwide
Pleuromyces; Dima, P.-A. Moreau & V. Papp	2018	Tubariaceae	Pleuromyces hungaricus V. Papp, Dima & P.-A. Moreau	1	Europe
Tubaria (W.G. Sm.) Gillet	1876	Tubariaceae	Tubaria furfuracea (Pers.) Gillet	89	Worldwide
Typhula (Pers.) Fr.	1818	Typhulaceae	Typhula incarnata Lasch (proposed)	68	Worldwide
Asterocyphella; W.B.Cooke	1961	Incertae sedis	Asterocyphella floccosa W.B.Cooke	3	
Adustomyces; Jülich	1979	Incertae sedis	Adustomyces lusitanicus (Torrend) Jülich	1	Europe, Africa
Agaricochaete; Eichelb.	1906	Incertae sedis	Agaricochaete mirabilis Eichelb.	4	Africa, Asia
Aureofungus; Hibbett, Manfr. Binder & Zheng Wang.	2003	Incertae sedis	Aureofungus yaninguaensis Manfr. Binder & Zheng Wang	1	extinct Dominican amber
Catilla; Pat.	1931	Incertae sedis	Catilla pandani (Pat.) Pat.	1	Polynesia
Chaetotyphula; Corner	1950	Incertae sedis	Chaetotyphula hyalina (Jungh.) Corner	7	Tropics
Chromocyphella; De Toni & Levi	1888	Incertae sedis	Cymbella crouanii Pat. & Doass.	5	Europe
Cyttarophyllopsis; R.Heim	1968	Incertae sedis	Cyttarophyllopsis cordispora R.Heim	1	India
Gasteroagaricoides; D.A.Reid	1986	Incertae sedis	Gasteroagaricoides ralstoniae D.A.Reid	1	Australia
Hemimycena; Singer	1938	Incertae sedis	Hemimycena lactea (Pers.) Singer	77	Worldwide
Hemistropharia; Jacobsson & E.Larss.	2007	Incertae sedis	Hemistropharia albocrenulata (Peck) Jacobsson & E.Larss.	1	United States
Lutypha; Khurana, K.S. Thind & Berthier.	1977	Incertae sedis	Lutypha sclerotiophila Khurana, K.S. Thind & Berthier	1	India
Maccagnia; Mattir.	1922	Incertae sedis	Maccagnia carnica Mattir.	1	Africa
Palaeoagaricites; Poinar & H.R.Buckley	2007	Incertae sedis	Palaeoagaracites antiquus Poinar & H.R.Buckley	1	Extinct; Burmese amber
Phaeocollybia; R.Heim	1931	Incertae sedis	Phaeocollybia lugubris (Fr.) R.Heim	88	Worldwide
Phaeoporotheleum; W.B.Cooke	1961	Incertae sedis	Phaeoporotheleum revivescens (Berk. & M.A.Curtis) W.B.Cooke	2	Cuba, Argentina
Ptychella; Roze & Boud.	1879	Incertae sedis	Ptychella ochracea Roze & Boud.	1	Europe
Tectella; Earle	1909	Incertae sedis	Tectella operculata (Berk. & M.A.Curtis) Earle	3	Northern hemisphere
Trichocybe; Vizzini	2010	Incertae sedis	Trichocybe puberula (Kuyper) Vizzini	1	Northwestern Europe
Tubariopsis; R.Heim	1931	Incertae sedis	Tubariopsis torquipes R.Heim	1	Madagascar
Tympanella; E. Horak	1971	Incertae sedis	Tympanella galanthina (Cooke & Massee) E. Horak	1	New Zealand
Volvariella; Speg.	1899	Incertae sedis	Volvariella argentina Speg.	93	
Wielandomyces; Raithelh.	1988	Incertae sedis	Wielandomyces robustus Raithelh.	1	Europe
Xeromphalina; Kühner & Maire	1934	Incertae sedis	Xeromphalina campanella (Batsch) Kühner & Maire	36	Worldwide

== See also ==
- List of Agaricales families
