= Episphaeria =

Scientific classification
- Kingdom: Fungi
- Division: Basidiomycota
- Class: Agaricomycetes
- Order: Agaricales
- Family: Crepidotaceae
- Genus: Episphaeria; Donk (1962)
- Species: E. fraxinicola

Binomial name
- Episphaeria fraxinicola (Berk. & Broome) Donk (1962)

Synonyms
- Cyphella fraxinicola Berk. & Broome (1875); Chaetocypha fraxinicola (Berk. & Broome) Kuntze (1891); Phaeocyphella fraxinicola (Berk. & Broome) Rea (1922)

Genus of fungi

Episphaeria is a genus of fungus in the Agaricales. The genus is monotypic, and contains the single rare species Episphaeria fraxinicola, found in Europe. The tiny fruit bodies of the fungus resemble minute, white cups that grow scattered or in groups on the bark of ash trees.

== Taxonomy and classification ==
The single species of Episphaeria was originally described under the name Cyphella fraxinicola by Miles Joseph Berkeley and Christopher Edmund Broome in an 1875 publication. Otto Kuntze transferred the species to Chaetocypha in 1891, and Carleton Rea moved it to Phaeocyphella in 1922. Marinus Anton Donk circumscribed Episphaeria in 1962 with E. fraxinicola as the type species. The specific epithet fraxinicola is derived from Fraxinus meaning "ash" and "colo" meaning "I inhabit".

The classification of Episphaeria with the Agaricales is not certain. Rolf Singer's 1986 The Agaricales in Modern Taxonomy included the genus in the Crepidotaceae based on morphological similarity, although that family as Singer envisioned it has since been shown with molecular analysis to be polyphyletic. The 10th edition of the Dictionary of the Fungi (2008) includes Episphaeria in the Inocybaceae, although they note that it may be appropriate for the Strophariaceae. They also make no distinction between the families Inocybaceae and Crepidotaceae, but rather call them both Inocybaceae. In a classification with both families present, a placement of Episphaeria within Crepidotaceae is more appropriate. A 2010 publication designed to clarify circumscription and delimitation of the Crepidotaceae and related Agaricales families includes the genus in the Crepidotaceae, but without molecular support, as they were unable to obtain any sequence data from their material of E. fraxinicola.

== Description ==
The minute fruit bodies of Episphaeria fraxinicola are cyphelloid, meaning they resemble species of discomycetes (or "cup fungi") in the Ascomycota. The fruit bodies consist of caps that are 0.25–2 mm, white, circular or nearly so, and lay flat on the substrate without a stem. They grow scattered or in groups, and are covered on their external surface with short hairs. The hymenium (spore-bearing surface) is light yellow, but becomes pale-brownish-gray as the spores mature. The spores are pale olive in color, elliptical, and measure 6 by 4 μm.

== Habitat and distribution ==
Episphaeria fraxinicola is a rare wood-decay fungus. It grows on the bark of ash trees (Fraxinus species), and prefers to grow on thin twigs at high heights. It is widely distributed in Europe.

== See also ==
- List of Agaricales genera
