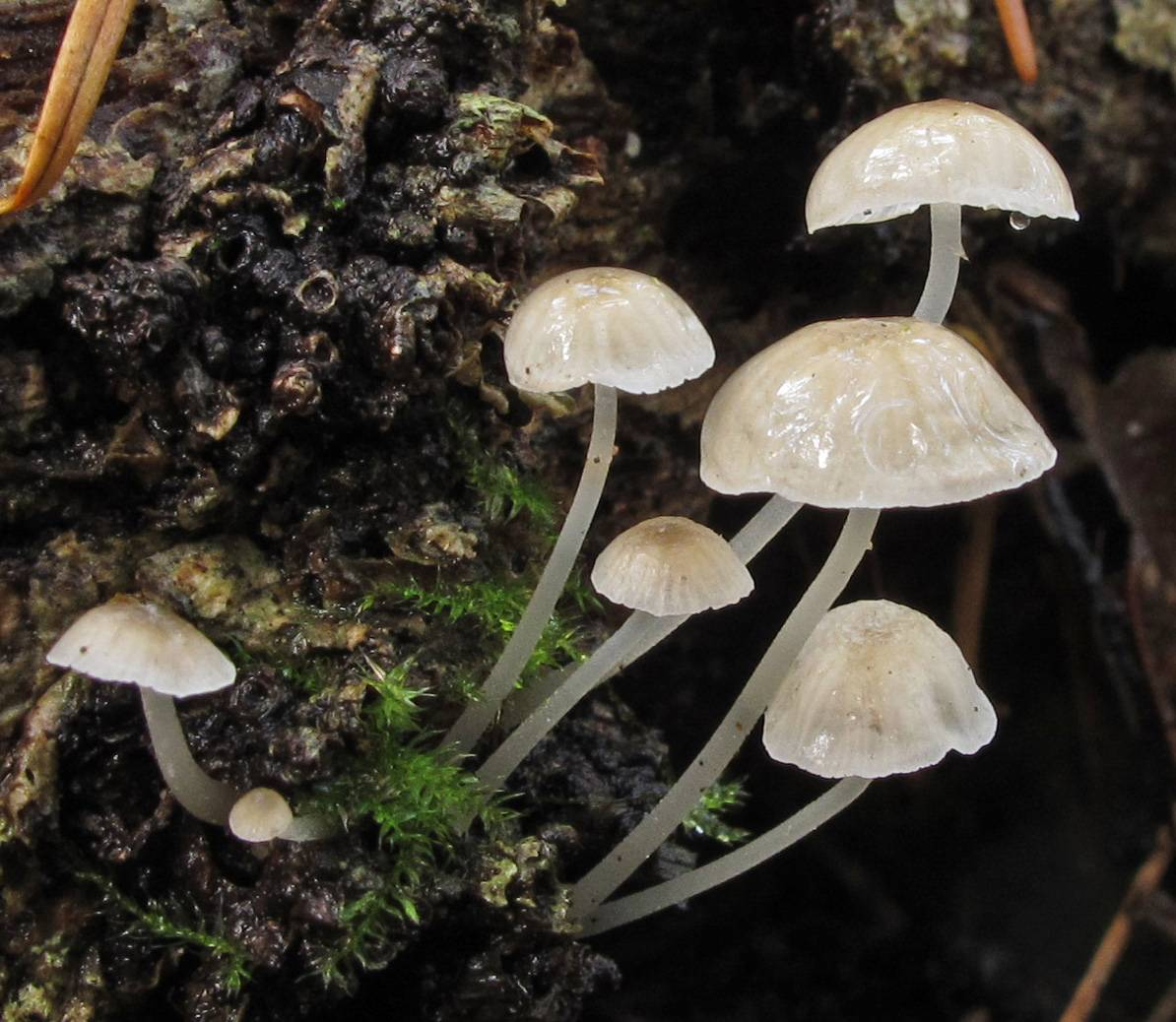
- Phloeomana speirea

Scientific classification
- Kingdom: Fungi
- Division: Basidiomycota
- Class: Agaricomycetes
- Order: Agaricales
- Suborder: Marasmineae
- Family: Porotheleaceae; Murrill (1916)

Type genus
- Porotheleum Fr. (1818)

Genera
- Chrysomycena; Clitocybula; Gerronema; Hydropus; Leucoinocybe; Megacollybia; Mycopan; Porotheleum; Pulverulina; Trogia

= Porotheleaceae =

Family of fungi

The Porotheleaceae are a family of saprotrophic, mainly wood-decay fungi in the order Agaricales that are primarily agarics, but also include cyphelloid fungi. The family has been informally cited in the literature as the 'hydropoid' clade. The type genus, Porotheleum, was placed in the phylogenetically defined clade in 2002, but the clade was more strongly supported in 2006, although without including Porotheleum. Its sister group is the Cyphellaceae, both of which are in the 'marasmioid clade'. Some included taxa are cultivated by ants. More recently, the family has been recognized in three analyses that included Porotheleum.

== See also ==
- List of Agaricales families
