= List of Agaricales families =

The Agaricales are an order of fungi in the class Agaricomycetes (division Basidiomycota). It is the largest group of mushroom-forming fungi, and includes more than 600 genera and over 25,000 species. Molecular phylogenetics analyses of ribosomal DNA sequences have led to advances in our understanding of the Agaricales, and substantially revised earlier assessments of families and genera. The following families are in the Agaricales, according to Kalichman, Kirk & Matheny (2020), with more recent additions and amendments, as noted. The number of genera and species in each family is taken from Catalogue of Life (2023), unless otherwise noted, and is subject to change as new research is published. Many genera are not as yet assigned to a family.

== Families ==
Family	Authority	Year	Type genus	# genera	# species	Example
Agaricaceae	Chevall.	1826	Agaricus; L.	71 (Note: Kalichman (2022) accepts 18 genera in Agaricaceae sensu stricto, placing many other genera in the Battarreaceae, Coprinaceae, and Verrucosporaceae.)	2308	Agaricus campestris
Amanitaceae	R.Heim ex Pouzar	1983	Amanita; Pers.	8	837	Amanita muscaria
Baisuzheniaceae	H. Qu, Z.W. Ge, Zhu L. Yang & Redhead	2025	Baisuzhenia; H. Qu, Z.W. Ge, Zhu L. Yang & Redhead	1	1	Baisuzhenia humphreyi
Biannulariaceae	Jülich	1981	Catathelasma; Lovejoy	3	17	Cleistocybe vernalis
Bolbitiaceae	Singer	1948	Bolbitius; Fr.	20	458	Bolbitius vitellinus
Broomeiaceae	Zeller	1948	Broomeia; Berk.	1	3	Broomeia congregata
Callistosporiaceae	Vizzini, Consiglio, M. Marchetti & P. Alvarado	2020	Callistosporium; Singer	6	34	Callistosporium luteo-olivaceum
Clavariaceae	Chevall.	1826	Clavaria; Vaill. ex L.	11	353	Clavaria zollingeri
Cortinariaceae	R.Heim ex Pouzar	1983	Cortinarius; Gray	19	3226	Cortinarius violaceus
Crassisporiaceae	Vizzini, Consiglio & M. Marchetti	2019	Crassisporium; Matheny, P.-A.Moreau & Vizzini	2	6	Crassisporium funariophilum
Crepidotaceae	(S. Imai) Singer	1951	Crepidotus (Fr.) Staude	5	150	Crepidotus cinnabarinus
Cyphellaceae	Lotsy	1907	Cyphella; Fr.	15	92	Cyphella ferruginea
Cystostereaceae	Jülich	1981	Cystostereum; Pouzar	6	24	Cystostereum murrayi
Entolomataceae	Kotl. & Pouzar	1972	Entoloma (Fr.) P.Kumm.	8	2250	Entoloma sinuatum
Fistulinaceae	Lotsy	1907	Fistulina; Bull.	3	13	Fistulina hepatica
Hemigasteraceae	Gäum. & C.W.Dodge	1928	Hemigaster; Juel	2	2	
Hydnangiaceae	Gäum. & C.W.Dodge	1928	Hydnangium; Wallr.	4	106	Laccaria amethystina
Hygrophoraceae	Lotsy	1907	Hygrophorus; Fr.	34	1026	Hygrophorus eburneus
Hymenogastraceae	Vittadini	1831	Hymenogaster (Fr.) Fr.	21	1577	Hebeloma helodes
Inocybaceae	Jülich	1982	Inocybe (Fr.) Fr.	7	1374	Inocybe obscura
Limnoperdaceae	G.A.Escobar	1976	Limnoperdon; G.A.Escobar	1	1	
Lycoperdaceae	F. Berchtold & J. Presl	1820	Lycoperdon; Pers.	16	411	Lycoperdon perlatum
Lyophyllaceae	Jülich	1982	Lyophyllum; P.Karst.	21	308	Lyophyllum decastes
Macrocystidiaceae	Kühner	1979	Macrocystidia; Joss.	1	6	Macrocystidia cucumis
Marasmiaceae	Roze ex Kühner	1980	Marasmius; Fr.	13	1205	Marasmius rotula
Mycenaceae	Overeem	1926	Mycena (Pers.) Roussel	27	1845	Mycena galericulata
Mythicomycetaceae	Vizzini, Consiglio & M. Marchetti	2019	Mythicomyces; Redhead & A.H.Sm.	2	2	Mythicomyces corneipes
Niaceae	Jülich	1981	Nia; R.T.Moore & Meyers	11	168	Merismodes fasciculata
Nidulariaceae	Dumort.	1822	Nidularia; Fr.	5	70	Cyathus striatus
Omphalotaceae	Bresinsky	1985	Omphalotus; Fayod	18	701	Omphalotus olearius
Phelloriniaceae	Doweld (Note: Kalichman (2022) considers Phelloriniaceae to be a later synonym of Battarreaceae with eight genera.)	2014 (Note: Initially published by Ulbrich in 1951, but this was invalid.)	Phellorinia; Berk.	2	2	Phellorinia herculeana
Phyllotopsidaceae	Locquin ex Olariaga, Huhtinen, Læssøe, J.H. Petersen & K. Hansen	2020	Phyllotopsis; E.-J. Gilbert & Donk ex Singer	3	17	Phyllotopsis nidulans
Physalacriaceae	Corner	1970	Physalacria; Peck	30	363	Rhodotus palmatus
Pleurotaceae	Kühner	1980	Pleurotus (Fr.) P.Kumm.	13	412	Pleurotus ostreatus
Pluteaceae	Kotl. & Pouzar	1972	Pluteus; Fr.	6	526	Pluteus cervinus
Porotheleaceae	Murrill	1916	Porotheleum; Fr.	7	27	Hydropus nigrita
Psathyrellaceae	Vilgalys & al.	2001	Psathyrella (Fr.) Quél.	27	1122	Psathyrella gracilis
Pseudoclitocybaceae	Vizzini, Consiglio, P.-A. Moreau & P. Alvarado	2018	Pseudoclitocybe (Singer) Singer (1956)	7	36	Pseudoclitocybe cyathiformis
Pterulaceae	Corner	1970	Pterula; Fr.	7 (Note: The paper states that "six genera" comprise the Pterulaceae, but lists seven.)	120	Pterula subulata
Radulomycetaceae	Leal-Dutra, Dentinger & G.W.Griff.	2020	Radulomyces; M.P. Christ.	3	34	Radulomyces copelandii
Schizophyllaceae	Quél.	1888	Schizophyllum; Fr.	3	14	Schizophyllum commune
Squamanitaceae	Jülich	1981	Squamanita; Imbach	6	65	Cystoderma carcharias
Stephanosporaceae	Oberw. & E.Horak	1979	Stephanospora; Pat. (1914)	7	51	Lindtneria trachyspora
Strophariaceae	Singer & A.H.Sm.	1946	Stropharia (Fr.) Quél.	14	704	Stropharia aeruginosa
Tricholomataceae	R.Heim ex Pouzar	1983	Tricholoma (Fr.) Staude	56 (Note: Kalichman et al. (2020) accept ten genera in Tricholomataceae sensu stricto, but many additional genera await research.)	540	Tricholoma flavovirens
Tubariaceae	Vizzini	2008	Tubaria (W.G. Sm.) Gillet	7	166	Tubaria furfuracea
Typhulaceae	Jülich	1982	Typhula (Pers.) Fr.	1	85	Typhula sclerotioides

== See also ==
- List of Agaricales genera
