= Semiomphalina =

Scientific classification
- Domain: Eukaryota
- Kingdom: Fungi
- Division: Basidiomycota
- Class: Agaricomycetes
- Order: Agaricales
- Family: Hygrophoraceae
- Genus: Semiomphalina; Redhead (1984)

Type species
- Semiomphalina leptoglossoides (Corner) Redhead (1984)

Synonyms
- Pseudocraterellus leptoglossoides Corner (1966)

Genus of fungi

Semiomphalina is a basidiolichen genus in the family Hygrophoraceae. The genus is monotypic, containing the single species Semiomphalina leptoglossoides, found in Papua New Guinea.

== See also ==
- List of Agaricales genera
