= Flabellimycena =

Scientific classification
- Kingdom: Fungi
- Division: Basidiomycota
- Class: Agaricomycetes
- Order: Agaricales
- Family: Mycenaceae
- Genus: Flabellimycena; Redhead (1984)

Type species
- Flabellimycena flava (Singer) Redhead (1984)

Genus of fungi

Flabellimycena is a fungal genus in the family Mycenaceae. The genus is monotypic, containing the single South American species Flabellimycena flava. The genus was described by Canadian mycologist Scott Redhead in 1984.

== See also ==
- List of Agaricales genera
