= Actiniceps =

Scientific classification
- Kingdom: Fungi
- Division: Basidiomycota
- Class: Agaricomycetes
- Order: Agaricales
- Family: Pterulaceae
- Genus: Actiniceps; Berk. & Broome

Type species
- Actiniceps thwaitesii Berk. & Broome

Genus of fungi

Actiniceps is a genus of fungi in the Pterulaceae family. It has a widespread distribution in tropical regions.

== Species ==
- Actiniceps cocos
- Actiniceps horrida
- Actiniceps laevis
- Actiniceps secunda
- Actiniceps subcapitata
- Actiniceps thwaitesii
- Actiniceps timmii
