= Gasteroagaricoides =

Scientific classification
- Kingdom: Fungi
- Division: Basidiomycota
- Class: Agaricomycetes
- Order: Agaricales
- Family: Psathyrellaceae
- Genus: Gasteroagaricoides; D.A.Reid (1986)

Type species
- Gasteroagaricoides ralstoniae D.A.Reid (1986)

Genus of fungi

Gasteroagaricoides is a fungal genus in the family Psathyrellaceae. The genus is monotypic, containing the single species Gasteroagaricoides ralstoniae, described from Norfolk Island by English mycologist Derek Reid in 1986.

== See also ==
- List of Agaricales genera
