= Allantula =

Scientific classification
- Kingdom: Fungi
- Division: Basidiomycota
- Class: Agaricomycetes
- Order: Agaricales
- Family: Pterulaceae
- Genus: Allantula; Corner (1952)

Type species
- Allantula diffusa Corner (1952)

Genus of fungi

Allantula is a fungal genus in the family Pterulaceae. The genus is monotypic, containing the singles species Allantula diffusa, found in Brazil. The genus and species were described by British mycologist E.J.H. Corner in 1952.

== See also ==
- List of Agaricales genera
