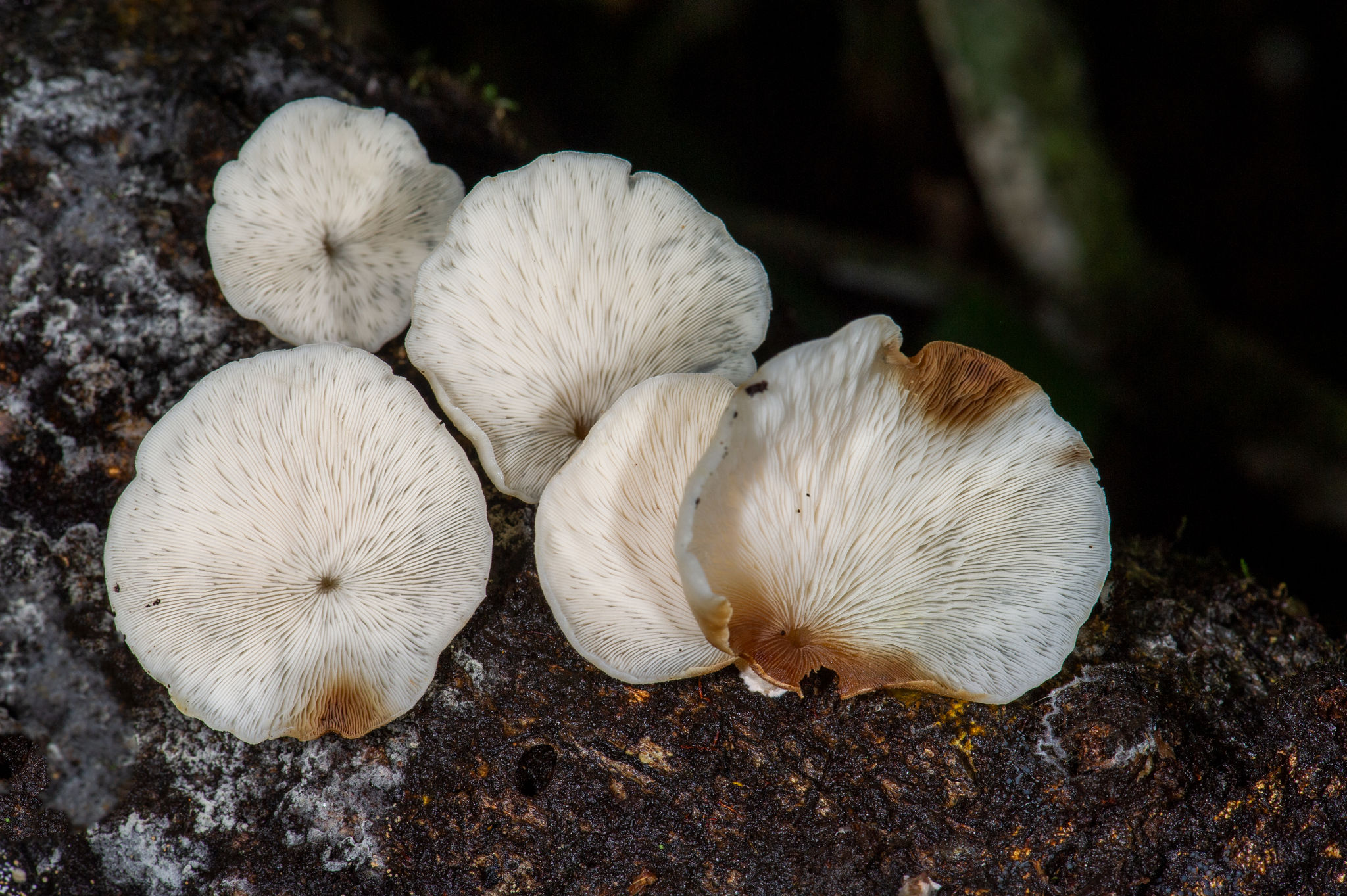

Scientific classification
- Kingdom: Fungi
- Division: Basidiomycota
- Class: Agaricomycetes
- Order: Agaricales
- Family: Cyphellaceae
- Genus: Campanophyllum; Cifuentes & R.H.Petersen (2003)

Type species
- Campanophyllum proboscideum (Fr.) Cifuentes & R.H.Petersen (2003)

Synonyms
- Lentinus proboscideus Fr. (1851); Pocillaria proboscidea (Fr.) Kuntze (1891)

= Campanophyllum =

Genus of fungi

Campanophyllum is a fungal genus in the family Cyphellaceae. The genus is monotypic, containing the single species Campanophyllum proboscideum, found in Costa Rica. The genus was circumscribed in 2003 to accommodate the species formerly known as Lentinus proboscoides.

== See also ==
- List of Agaricales genera
