= Lycoperdopsis =

Scientific classification
- Kingdom: Fungi
- Division: Basidiomycota
- Class: Agaricomycetes
- Order: Agaricales
- Family: Agaricaceae
- Genus: Lycoperdopsis; Henn. (1900)

Type species
- Lycoperdopsis arcyrioides Henn. & E.Nyman (1900)

Genus of fungi

Lycoperdopsis is a fungal genus in the family Agaricaceae. A monotypic genus, it contains the single gasteroid species Lycoperdopsis arcyrioides, described as new to science in 1900.

== See also ==
- List of Agaricaceae genera
- List of Agaricales genera
