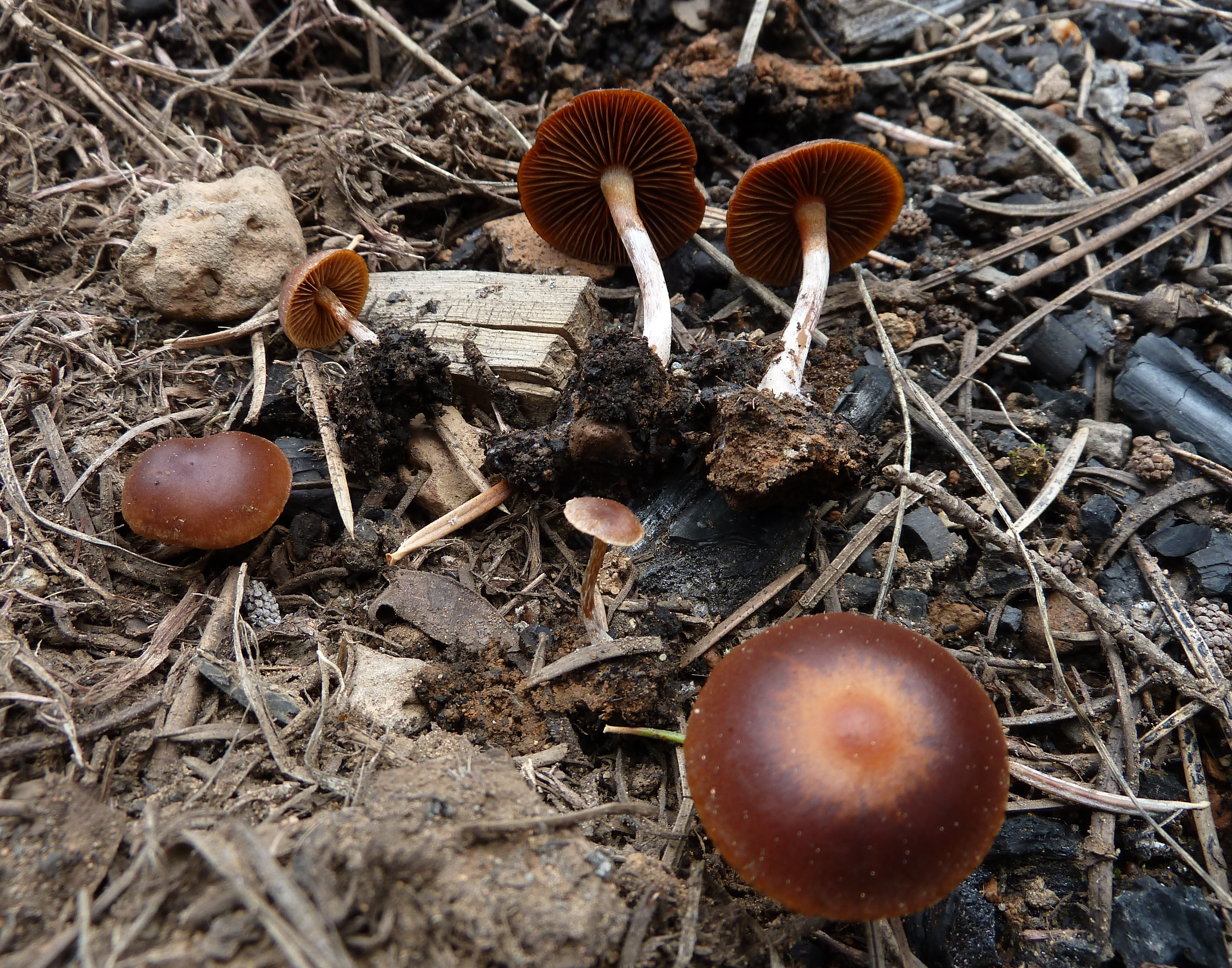
- Pachylepyrium carbonicola

Scientific classification
- Kingdom: Fungi
- Division: Basidiomycota
- Class: Agaricomycetes
- Order: Agaricales
- Family: Tubariaceae
- Genus: Pachylepyrium; Singer (1958)

Type species
- Pachylepyrium fulvidula (Singer) Singer (1958)

Species
- P. carbonicola P. fulvidula P. wrightii

= Pachylepyrium =

Genus of fungi

Pachylepyrium is a genus of fungi in the family Tubariaceae. The genus was circumscribed by Rolf Singer in 1958. The genus Pachylepyrium is widespread in northern temperate areas. Some species of Pachylepyrium have been moved to the genus Crassisporium.

== See also ==
- List of Agaricales genera
