= Haasiella =

Scientific classification
- Kingdom: Fungi
- Division: Basidiomycota
- Class: Agaricomycetes
- Order: Agaricales
- Family: Hygrophoraceae
- Genus: Haasiella; Kotl. & Pouzar (1966)
- Species: H. venustissima

Binomial name
- Haasiella venustissima Kotl. & Pouzar (1966)

Synonyms
- Gerronema splendidissimum (Kotl. & Pouzar) Singer (1973); Omphalina venustissima var. splendidissima (Kotl. & Pouzar) E. Ludw. (2001); Haasiella venustissima var. splendidissima (Kotl. & Pouzar) P. Roux (2008); Agaricus venustissimus Fr. (1861); Clitocybe venustissima (Fr.) P. Karst. (1879); Omphalia venustissima (Fr.) Quél. (1886); Omphalina venustissima (Fr.) Quél. (1886); Gerronema venustissimum (Fr.) Singer (1962); Haasiella venustissima (Fr.) Kotl. & Pouzar (1966); Haasiella venustissima (Fr.) Kotl. & Pouzar ex Chiaffi & Surault (1996)

Genus of fungi

Haasiella is a fungal genus in the family Hygrophoraceae. It is a monotypic genus that contains only the species Haasiella venustissima. Haasiella splendidissima, formerly considered to be a distinct species based on its 4-spored basidia, was found by a DNA study to be synonymous with Haasiella venustissima. Haasiella venustissima is only known from Europe and is saprotrophic on wood. Haasiella was described as a new genus in 1966 by Czech mycologists František Kotlaba and Zdeněk Pouzar. It is most closely related to the genus Hygrophorus.

The genus name is in honour of Hans Haas, a German mycologist, who was a specialist on Agaricus from Schnait near Stuttgart.

== See also ==
- List of Agaricales genera
