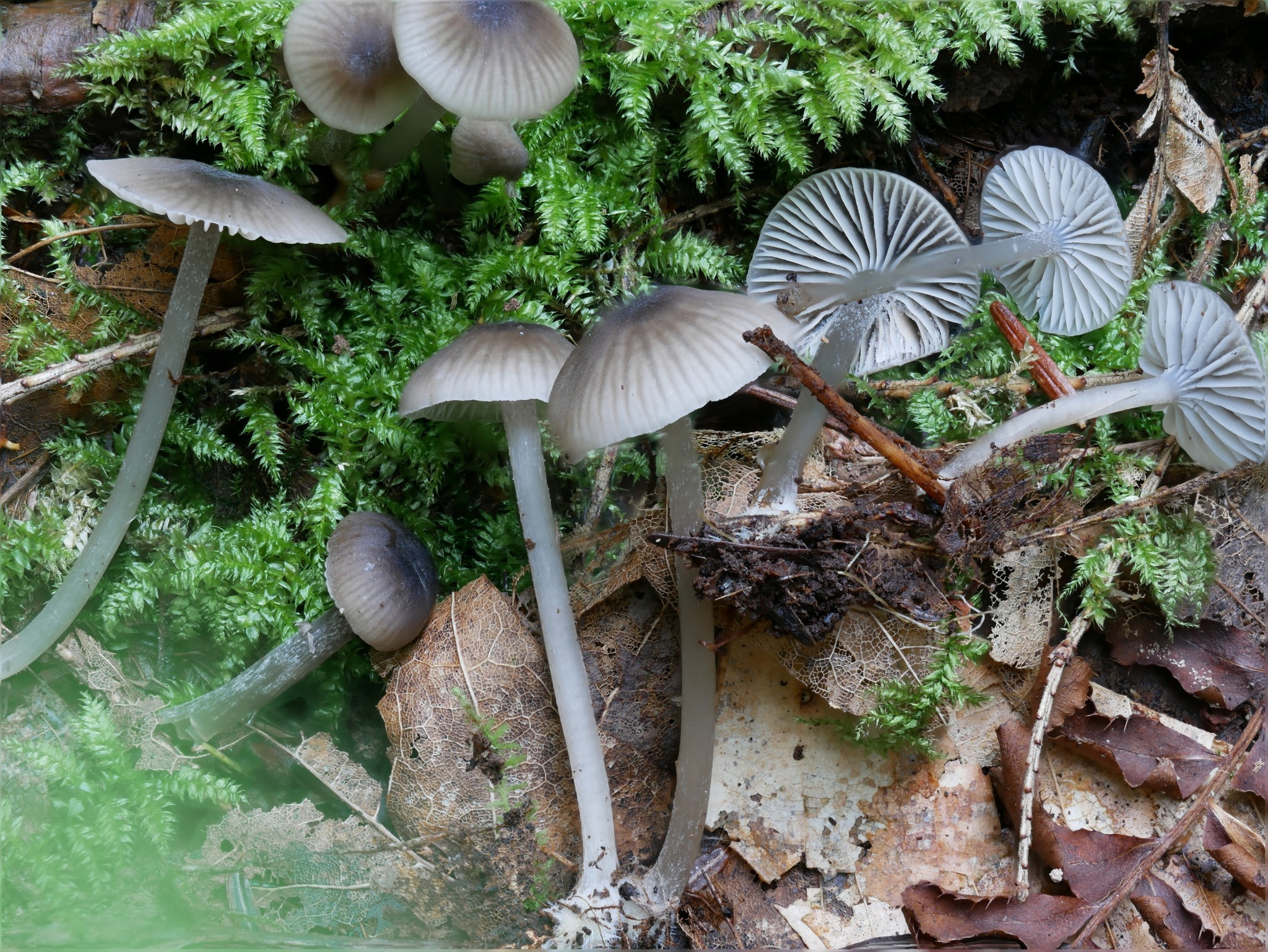
- Mycopan scabripes

Scientific classification
- Kingdom: Fungi
- Division: Basidiomycota
- Class: Agaricomycetes
- Order: Agaricales
- Family: Cyphellaceae
- Genus: Mycopan; Redhead, Moncalvo & Vilgalys (2013)

Type species
- Mycopan scabripes (Murrill) Redhead, Moncalvo & Vilgalys (2013)

Synonyms
- Mycena scabripes (Murrill) Murrill (1916); Prunulus scabripes Murrill (1916); Hydropus scabripes (Murrill) Singer (1962)

= Mycopan =

Genus of fungi

Mycopan is one of several genera of agaric fungi (mushrooms) that were formerly classified in the genus Hydropus or Mycena. Mycopan is currently monotypic, containing the single species Mycopan scabripes.

== Taxonomy ==
Phylogenetically, Mycopan is distant from the Mycenaceae and the type of that family, Mycena, and it is not with the type of Hydropus, H. fuliginarius. Mycopan grouped closest to Baeospora. Baeospora was shown to be in the Cyphellaceae by Matheny and colleagues.

=== Etymology ===
The name Mycopan alludes to a fungal (myco-) version of the classical Greek deity Pan and his furry legs and woodland home.

== Description ==
It produces dusky colored fruit bodies that are mycenoid, but lack amyloid or dextrinoid tissues except for the amyloid basidiospores. The cap is up to 3 centimetres (1 1/4 in) wide. Its stipe is notably scruffy from cystidioid end cells and unlike true Hydropus it does not bleed clear fluid.

Its edibility is unknown and it is of little substance regardless.

== Habitat and distribution ==
Mycopan scabripes grows from debris in forest floors in North America and Europe.

== See also ==
- List of Agaricales genera
