= Hemigasteraceae =

Scientific classification
- Kingdom: Fungi
- Division: Basidiomycota
- Class: Agaricomycetes
- Order: Agaricales
- Family: Hemigasteraceae; Gäum. & C.W.Dodge (1928)

Genera
- Flammulogaster; Hemigaster

Family of fungi

Hemigasteraceae is a family of fungi in the order Agaricales.

Genera:

- Flammulogaster
- Hemigaster

== See also ==
- List of Agaricales families
