= Wielandomyces =

Scientific classification
- Kingdom: Fungi
- Division: Basidiomycota
- Class: Agaricomycetes
- Order: Agaricales
- Family: Bolbitiaceae
- Genus: Wielandomyces; Raithelh. (1988)

Type species
- Wielandomyces robustus Raithelh. (1988)

Genus of fungi

Wielandomyces is a fungal genus in the family Bolbitiaceae. This is a monotypic genus, containing the single species Wielandomyces robustus, found in Europe. The genus and species were described by Jörg Raithelhuber in 1988.

== See also ==
- List of Agaricales genera
