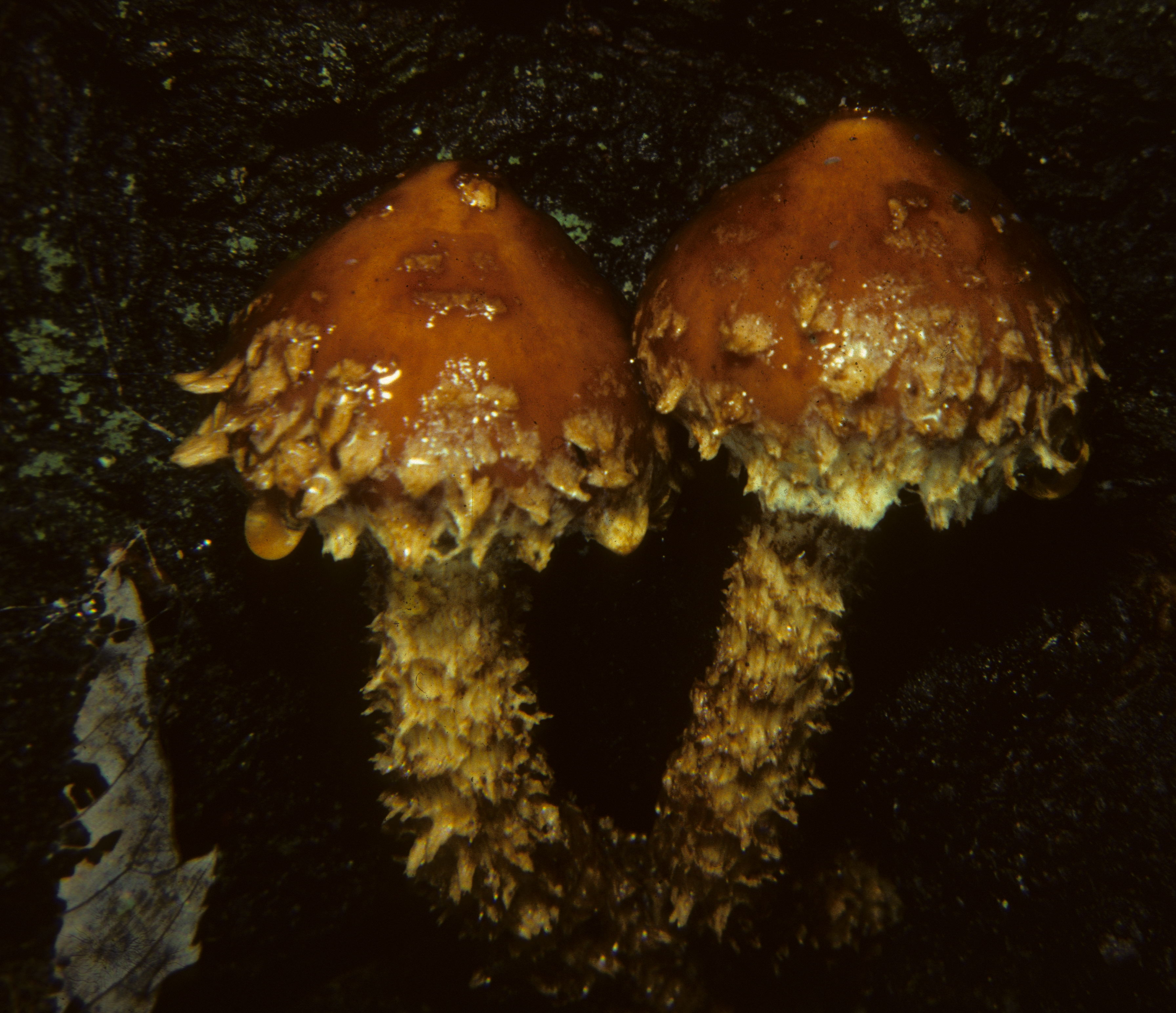
- In Hocking Hills State Forest, Ohio, USA

Scientific classification
- Kingdom: Fungi
- Division: Basidiomycota
- Class: Agaricomycetes
- Order: Agaricales
- Family: unknown (possibly Hymenogastraceae or Tubariaceae)
- Genus: Hemistropharia (Peck) Jacobsson & E.Larss. (2007)
- Species: H. albocrenulata

Binomial name
- Hemistropharia albocrenulata Peck

Synonyms
- Agaricus albocrenulatus Peck (1873); Pholiota fusca Quél. (1877); Pholiota albocrenulata (Peck) Sacc. (1887); Hypodendrum albocrenulatum (Peck) Overh. (1932); Hebeloma albocrenulatum (Peck) Singer (1939); Stropharia albocrenulata (Peck) Kreisel (1964); Hemipholiota albocrenulata (Peck) Romagn. (1980); Hemipholiota albocrenulata (Peck) Romagn. ex Bon (1994)

= Hemistropharia =

Genus of fungi

Hemistropharia is a genus of agarics of unclear classification, though possibly related to the Hymenogastraceae or Tubariaceae. A monotypic genus, it contains the single species Hemistropharia albocrenulata. This species, originally named Agaricus albocrenulatus by American mycologist Charles Horton Peck in 1873, is synonymous with the names Pholiota albocrenulata (Peck) Sacc. and Stropharia albocrenulata (Peck) Kreisel, among others.

The orangish cap is up to 9 centimetres (3 1/2 in) wide and the stem is up to 12 cm (4 3/4 in) long. The spore print is brown. It is reportedly nonpoisonous.

The genus most closely resembles a typical Pholiota where it was previously classified and described and it causes a decay in trees as does a true Pholiota. Unlike Pholiota, H. albocrenulata lacks chrysocystidia, and it has darker basidiospores.

== See also ==
- List of Agaricales genera
