= Glyptoderma =

Scientific classification
- Kingdom: Fungi
- Division: Basidiomycota
- Class: Agaricomycetes
- Order: Agaricales
- Family: Agaricaceae
- Genus: Glyptoderma; R.Heim & Perr.-Bertr. (1971)

Type species
- Glyptoderma coelatum (Pat. ex R.Heim) R.Heim & Perr.-Bertr. (1971)

Synonyms
- Mycenastrum coelatum Pat. (1899); Scleroderma coelatum (Pat.) Sacc. & P.Syd. (1902)

Genus of fungi

Glyptoderma is a fungal genus in the family Agaricaceae. It is a monotypic genus, containing the single species Glyptoderma coelatum.

== See also ==
- List of Agaricaceae genera
- List of Agaricales genera
