= Retiperidiolia =

Scientific classification
- Kingdom: Fungi
- Division: Basidiomycota
- Class: Agaricomycetes
- Order: Agaricales
- Family: Nidulariaceae
- Genus: Retiperidiolia; Kraisit., Choeyklin, Boonprat. & M.E. Sm. (2022)

Type species
- Retiperidiolia reticulata (Petch) Kraisit., Choeyklin, Boonprat. & M.E. Sm. (2022)

Species
- Retiperidiolia aquaphila Retiperidiolia reticulata

Genus of fungi in the Nidulariaceae

Retiperidiolia is a genus of fungi in the family Nidulariaceae. Basidiocarps (fruit bodies) are typically under 10 mm in diameter and irregularly spherical. Each produces a number of peridioles which contain the spores and are released from the disintegrating fruit bodies at maturity. Species are usually found growing on herbaceous stems and other plant debris. The genus has a tropical distribution. Species were previously referred to Mycocalia, but molecular research, based on cladistic analysis of DNA sequences, found that they were not closely related.

== See also ==
- List of Agaricales genera
