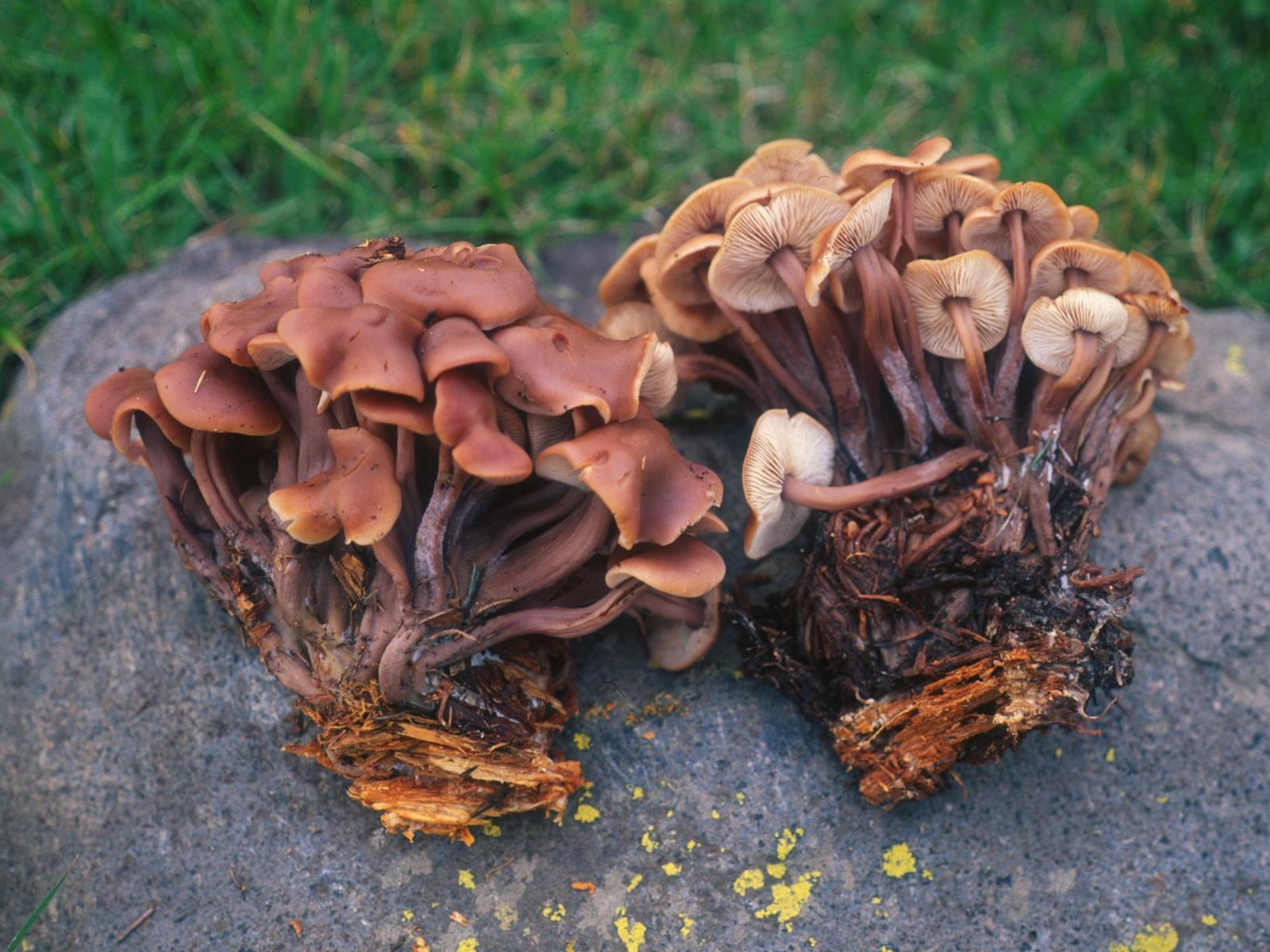
- Connopus acervatus

Scientific classification
- Kingdom: Fungi
- Division: Basidiomycota
- Class: Agaricomycetes
- Order: Agaricales
- Family: Omphalotaceae
- Genus: Connopus; R.H.Petersen (2010)

Type species
- Connopus acervatus (Fries) R.H.Petersen (1821)

Synonyms
- Agaricus acervatus Fr. (1821); Agaricus erythropus var. acervatus (Fr.) Pers. (1828); Collybia acervata (Fr.) P.Kumm. (1871); Marasmius acervatus (Fr.) P.Karst. (1889); Gymnopus acervatus (Fr.) Murrill (1916)

= Connopus =

Genus of fungi

Connopus is a fungal genus in the family Omphalotaceae. The monotypic genus was circumscribed in 2010 to accommodate the species Connopus acervatus, formerly in the genus Gymnopus.

The cap is up to 4 centimetres (1 1/2 in) wide, with regions of reddish-brown and cream colours. The gills are adnexed and white, darkening with age. The stem is up to 8 cm (3 1/8 in) long. The spore print is white.

It is found in North American and Europe, where it grows in dense clusters on decaying wood. It is regarded as inedible.
