= Ptychella =

Scientific classification
- Kingdom: Fungi
- Division: Basidiomycota
- Class: Agaricomycetes
- Order: Agaricales
- Family: Bolbitiaceae
- Genus: Ptychella; Roze & Boud.

Type species
- Ptychella ochracea Boud.

Genus of fungi

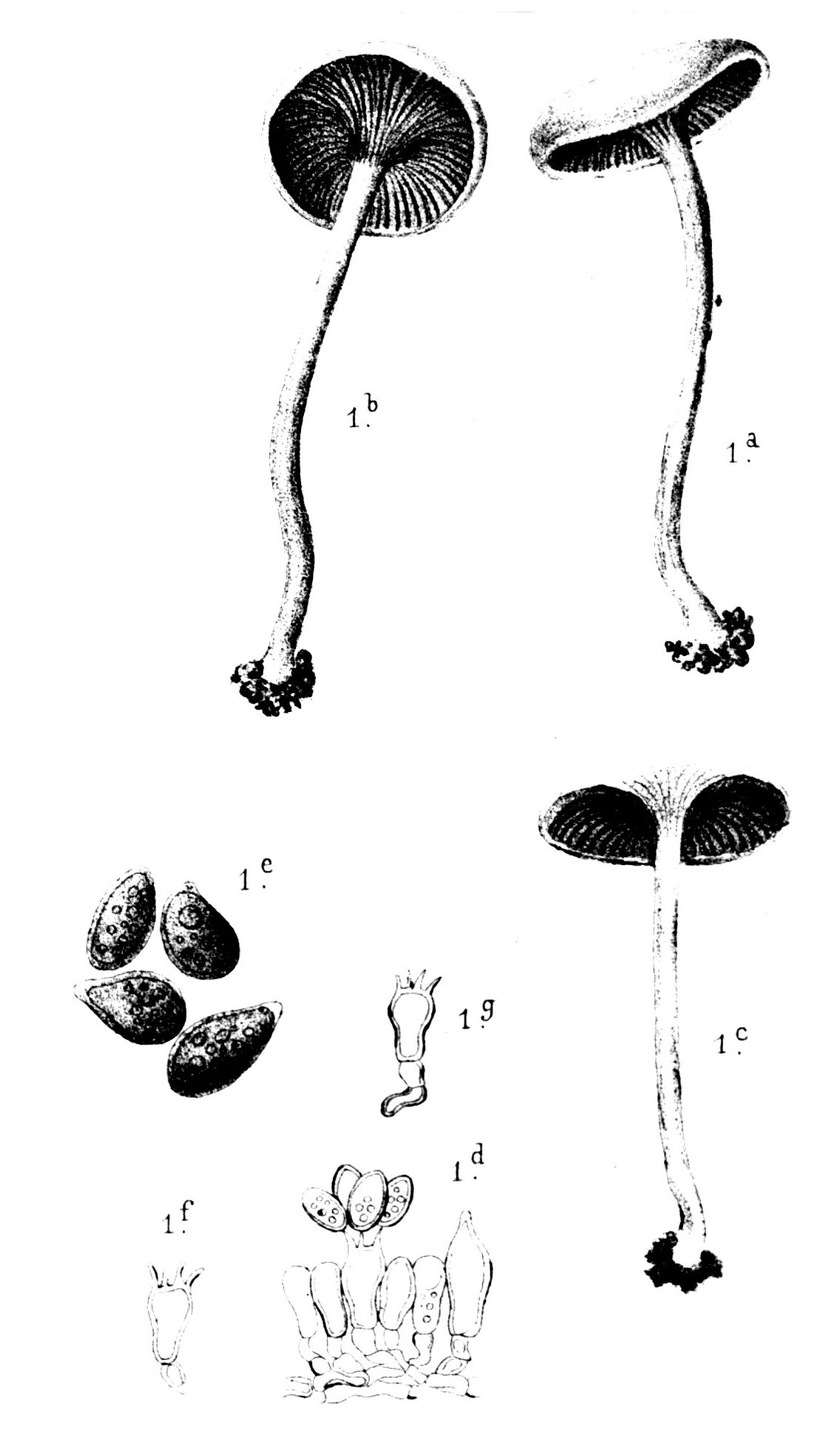
Ptychella ochracea in Roze & Boudier, 1879

Ptychella is a genus of fungi in the Bolbitiaceae family of mushrooms. This is a monotypic genus, containing the single species Ptychella ochracea.
