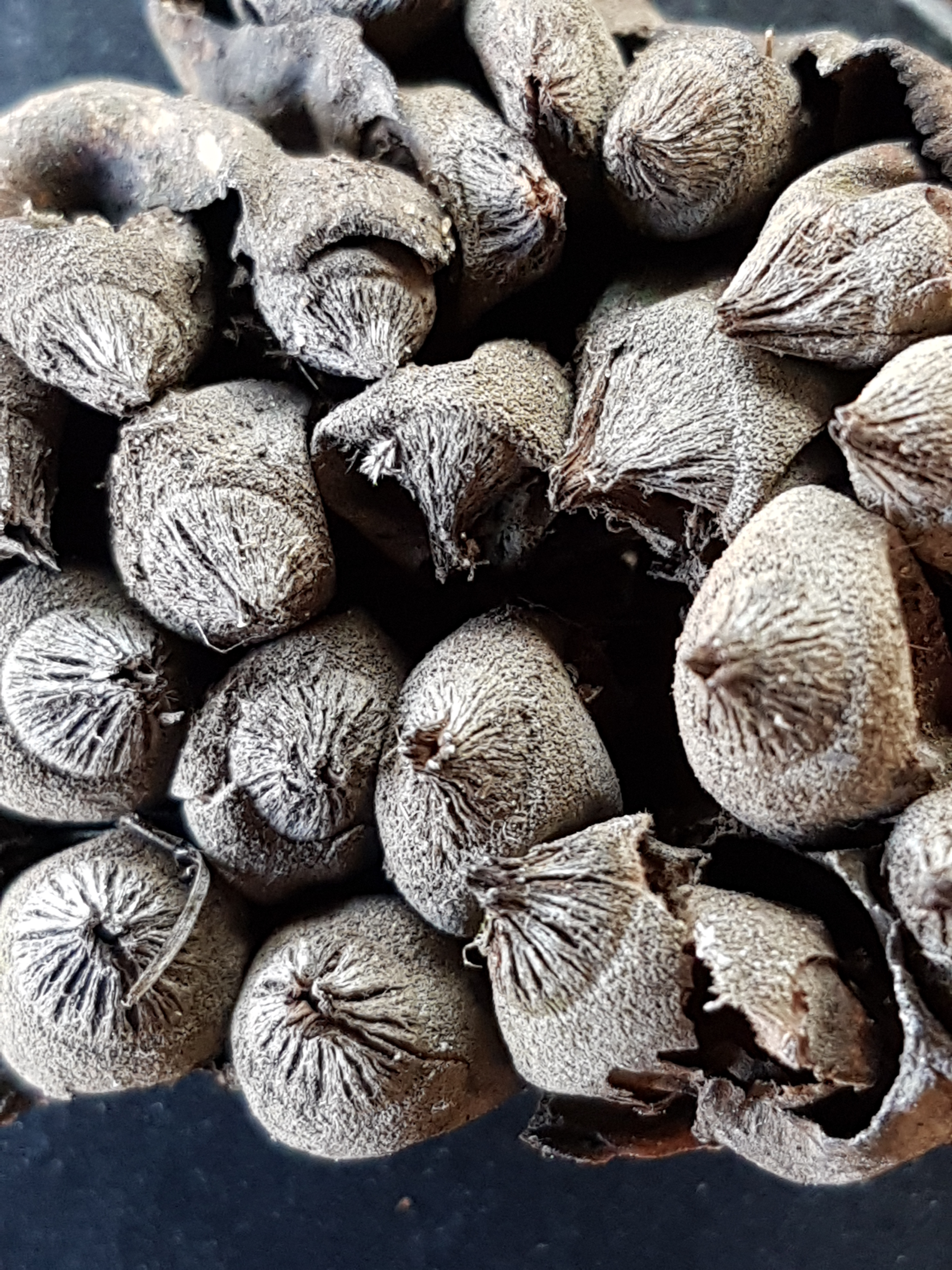

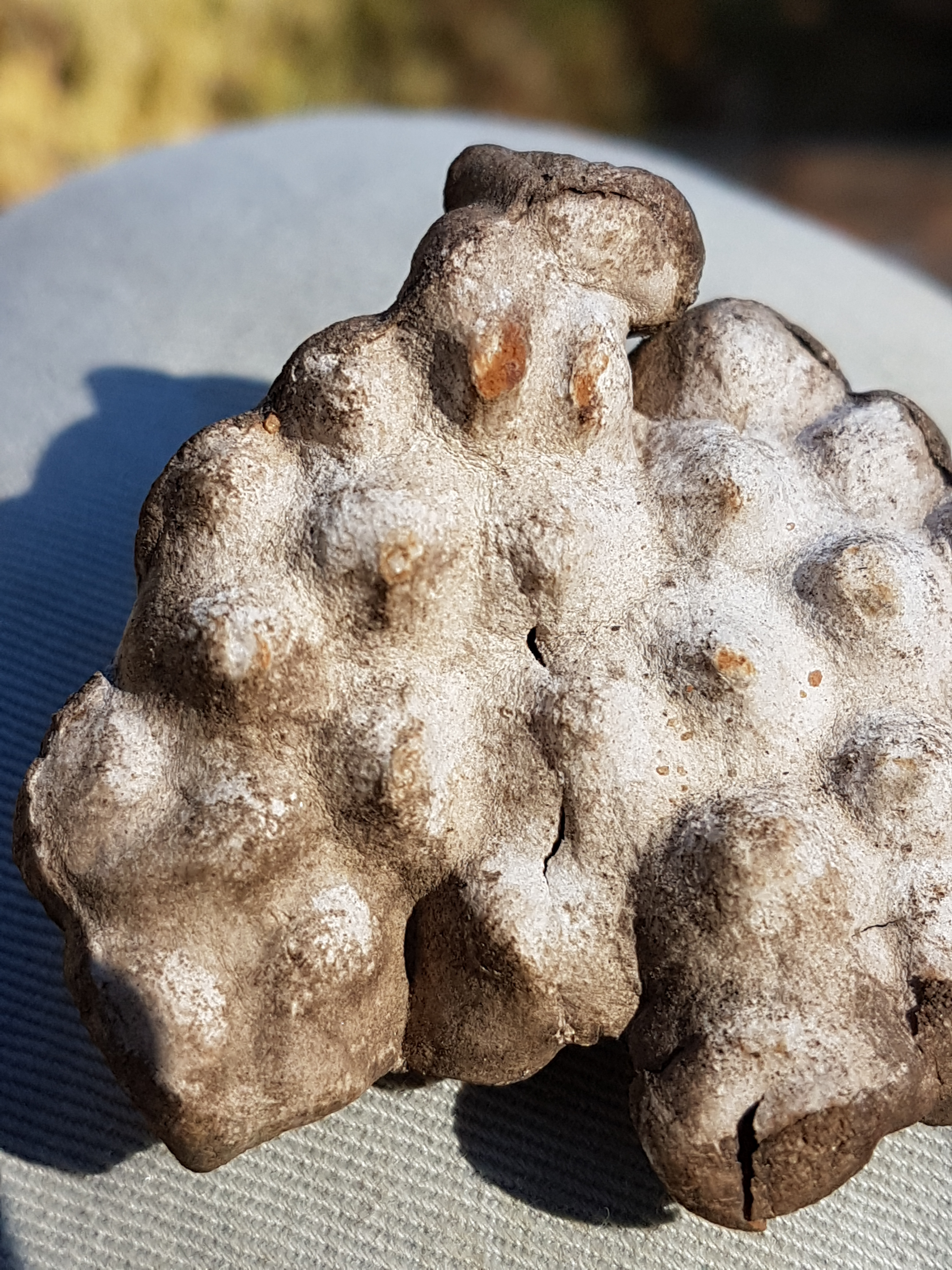
- Underside

Scientific classification
- Kingdom: Fungi
- Division: Basidiomycota
- Class: Agaricomycetes
- Order: Agaricales
- Family: Broomeiaceae; Zeller (1948)
- Genus: Broomeia; Berk. (1844)

Type species
- Broomeia congregata Berk. (1844)

Species
- Broomeia congregata Broomeia ellipsospora Broomeia guadalupensis

= Broomeia =

Family of fungi

The Broomeiaceae are a family of fungi in the order Agaricales. The family is monotypic, and contains the single genus Broomeia, described by English naturalist Miles Joseph Berkeley in 1844, and named for his collaborator, Christopher Edmund Broome. Berkeley designated the type species to be Broomeia congregata. Species of this fungus family can be found in Mexico as well as various parts of Africa.

== See also ==
- List of Agaricales families
