= Gloeocorticium =

Scientific classification
- Kingdom: Fungi
- Division: Basidiomycota
- Class: Agaricomycetes
- Order: Agaricales
- Family: Cyphellaceae
- Genus: Gloeocorticium; Hjortstam & Ryvarden (1986)

Type species
- Gloeocorticium cinerascens Hjortstam & Ryvarden (1986)

Genus of fungi

Gloeocorticium is a genus of fungi in the Cyphellaceae family. The genus is monotypic, containing the single species Gloeocorticium cinerascens, found in Argentina.
