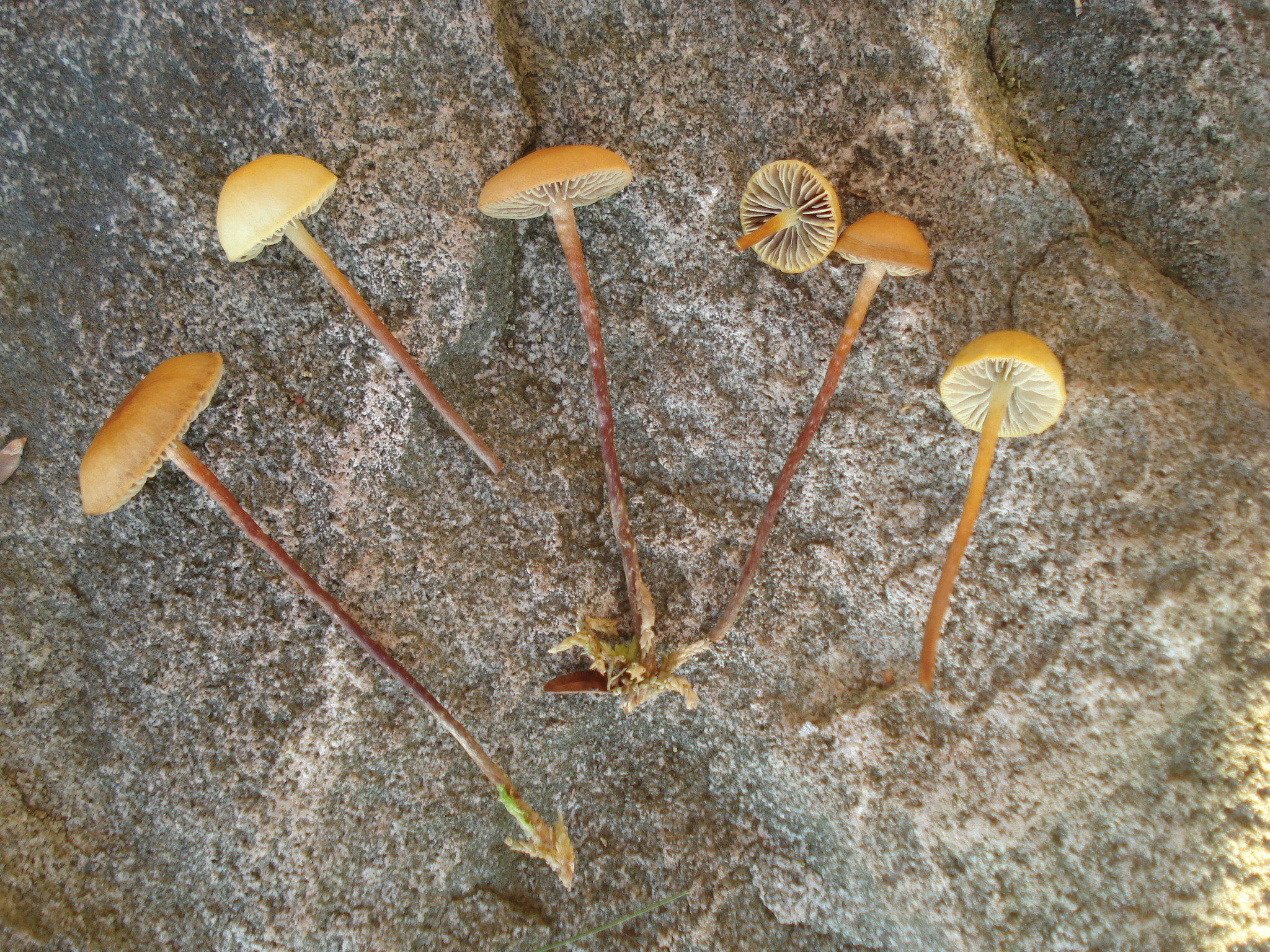
- Bogbodia uda

Scientific classification
- Kingdom: Fungi
- Division: Basidiomycota
- Class: Agaricomycetes
- Order: Agaricales
- Family: Strophariaceae
- Genus: Bogbodia; Redhead (2013)
- Species: B. uda

Binomial name
- Bogbodia uda (Pers.) Redhead (2013)

Synonyms
- Agaricus udus Pers. (1801); Coprinarius udus (Pers.) P.Kumm. (1871); Hypholoma udum (Pers.) Quél. (1877); Psilocybe uda (Pers.) Gillet (1878); Naematoloma udum (Pers.) P.Karst. (1880); Geophila uda (Pers.) Quél. (1886); Dryophila uda (Pers.) Quél. (1888); Hypholoma fulvidulum P.D.Orton (1999)

= Bogbodia =

Genus of fungi

Bogbodia is a bog-inhabiting agaric fungal genus that colonizes peat and Sphagnum and produces tan-colored fruit bodies. The only species in the genus is Bogbodia uda. Characteristically it forms chrysocystidia and rather large, finely roughened, violaceous basidiospores each with a poorly defined germ pore. The genus differs from Hypholoma which has smaller, smooth basidiospores and typically have cespitose fruit bodies and decay wood. Phylogenetically, Bogbodia is distinct from Hypholoma, Pholiota, and Leratiomyces.

== Etymology ==
The name Bogbodia alludes to the tan color and occurrence in northern peat bogs as do bog bodies.
