= Olotia =

Scientific classification
- Domain: Eukaryota
- Kingdom: Fungi
- Division: Basidiomycota
- Class: Agaricomycetes
- Order: Agaricales
- Family: Psathyrellaceae
- Genus: Olotia; D.Wächt & A.Melzer (2020)
- Species: O. codinae

Binomial name
- Olotia codinae (Deschuyteneer, A.Melzer & Pérez-De-Greg.) D.Wächt & A.Melzer (2020)

Synonyms
- Psathyrella codinae Deschuyteneer, A.Melzer & Pérez-De-Greg. (2018)

Single-species fungal genus

Olotia is a fungal genus in the family Psathyrellaceae. The monotypic genus contains the single species Olotia codinae, a mushroom-forming fungus that was previously classified as Psathyrella codinae. It is only known to occur in Catalonia, Spain.

== Taxonomy ==
The genus Olotia was established in 2020 by the German mycologists Dieter Wächter & Andreas Melzer when the family Psathyrellaceae was subdivided based on phylogenetic analysis. Several members of Psathyrella were reclassified and placed in new genera. A single species was placed in Olotia.

The type species, Olotia codinae was previously known as Psathyrella codinae after being classified in 2018 from a discovery in Spain, where it is so far only known from. The genus is named after the city of Olot in Spain, where the type species was documented. Psathyrella codinae was named in memory of Catalonian mycologist Joaquim Codina, 150 years after his birth.

== Description ==
The cap (pileus) of Olotia codinae measures 8.5–15 mm in diameter and has a paraboloid shape. Its surface is smooth and faintly striate up to one-third from the margin. Young specimens display colouration ranging from pale brown to yellowish-brown towards the margin, with a darker centre. As the fungus matures, it develops warm reddish-brown tones, which fade to a pale flesh-coloured brown when dry. The cap lacks pinkish tones. The gills (lamellae) are somewhat ventricose (bulging in the middle), broadly attached to the stem (adnate), and spaced relatively far apart (subdistant). They are light greyish-brown in colour with a minutely white fringed edge. The veil is sparse and quickly disappears, but forms numerous though short-lived white filaments on the cap and small tufts of fibres hanging from the cap margin and covering the lower two-thirds of the stem in mature specimens. The stem (stipe) measures 17–24 mm in length and 1.8–2.8 mm in thickness. It is cylindrical, hollow, and ranges in colour from whitish or pale yellowish-brown (isabelline), later discolouring to dirty brown from the base upwards. The top of the stem is covered with a fine powder-like layer (pruinose), while the lower two-thirds are densely covered with fibrous veil remnants. The stem does not extend into a root-like structure. The fungus has a slightly radish-like smell and an indistinct taste.

== Habitat ==
Olotia codinae has been found growing on a stump of living common oak (Quercus robur) in Catalonia, Spain.
