= Merulicium =

Scientific classification
- Kingdom: Fungi
- Division: Basidiomycota
- Class: Agaricomycetes
- Order: Agaricales
- Family: Pterulaceae
- Genus: Merulicium; J. Erikss. & Ryvarden

Type species
- Merulicium fusisporum (Romell) J. Erikss. & Ryvarden

Genus of fungi

Merulicium is a genus of fungi, tentatively placed in the Pterulaceae family. The genus is monotypic, containing the single species Merulicium fusisporum.
