= Chrysomycena =

Scientific classification
- Domain: Eukaryota
- Kingdom: Fungi
- Division: Basidiomycota
- Class: Agaricomycetes
- Order: Agaricales
- Family: Porotheleaceae
- Genus: Chrysomycena; Vizzini, Picillo, L. Perrone & Dovana
- Species: C. perplexa

Binomial name
- Chrysomycena perplexa Picillo, Vizzini & L. Perrone

Genus of fungi

Chrysomycena is an agaric fungal genus comprising one wood-decaying species found in Italy, Chrysomycena perplexa. It was first formally named in 2019.

The species has small golden yellow fruiting bodies resembling unrelated agarics in the Hygrophoraceae or Mycenaceae, with slightly slippery caps and a frosted yellowish stipe. The spores are slightly amyloid and the tissues of the fruitbodies have sarcodimitic construction.
