= Laccariopsis =

Conservation status
- Endangered (IUCN 3.1)

Scientific classification
- Kingdom: Fungi
- Division: Basidiomycota
- Class: Agaricomycetes
- Order: Agaricales
- Family: Physalacriaceae
- Genus: Laccariopsis; Vizzini (2012)
- Species: L. mediterranea

Binomial name
- Laccariopsis mediterranea (Pacioni & Lalli) Vizzini (2012)

Synonyms
- Hydropus mediterraneus Pacioni & Lalli (1985); Flammulina mediterranea (Pacioni & Lalli) Bas & Robich (1988); Oudemansiella mediterranea (Pacioni & Lalli) E.Horak (1988); Xerula mediterranea (Pacioni & Lalli) Quadr. & Lunghini (1990)

Genus of fungi

Laccariopsis is an agaric fungal genus with a rooting stipe, and a superficial resemblance to Laccaria. A monotypic genus, it contains the single species Laccariopsis mediterranea, which grows in sand dunes around the Mediterranean Sea on shores and colonizes Ammophila and Juniperus roots. Phylogenetically it is placed in the Physalacriaceae.

== Etymology ==
The name Laccariopsis means (-opsis) like a Laccaria.
