= Parvodontia =

Scientific classification
- Kingdom: Fungi
- Division: Basidiomycota
- Class: Agaricomycetes
- Order: Agaricales
- Family: Cystostereaceae
- Genus: Parvodontia; Hjortstam & Ryvarden (2004)

Type species
- Parvodontia luteocystidia Hjortstam & Ryvarden (2004)

Genus of fungi

Parvodontia is a fungal genus in the family Cystostereaceae. This is a monotypic genus, containing the single species Parvodontia luteocystidia, a crust fungus that grows on bamboo in Brazil. Parvodontia was first described in 2004 by Hjortstam and Ryvarden. The genus was established to classify a crust fungus found on bamboo in Brazil.
