= Sphaerobasidioscypha =

Scientific classification
- Kingdom: Fungi
- Division: Basidiomycota
- Class: Agaricomycetes
- Order: Agaricales
- Family: Cyphellaceae
- Genus: Sphaerobasidioscypha; Agerer (1983)

Type species
- Sphaerobasidioscypha citrispora Agerer (1983)

Species
- S. citrispora S. oberwinkleri

Genus of fungi

Sphaerobasidioscypha is a genus of fungi in the Cyphellaceae family. The genus contains two species found in New Zealand and Venezuela.
