= Nanstelocephala =

Scientific classification
- Domain: Eukaryota
- Kingdom: Fungi
- Division: Basidiomycota
- Class: Agaricomycetes
- Order: Agaricales
- Family: Crepidotaceae
- Genus: Nanstelocephala; Oberw. & R.H.Petersen (1990)

Type species
- Nanstelocephala physalacrioides Oberw. & R.H.Petersen (1990)

Genus of fungi

Nanstelocephala is a genus of fungus in the family Crepidotaceae It was originally placed in Cortinariaceae. The genus is monotypic, containing the single species Nanstelocephala physalacrioides, found in the USA.
