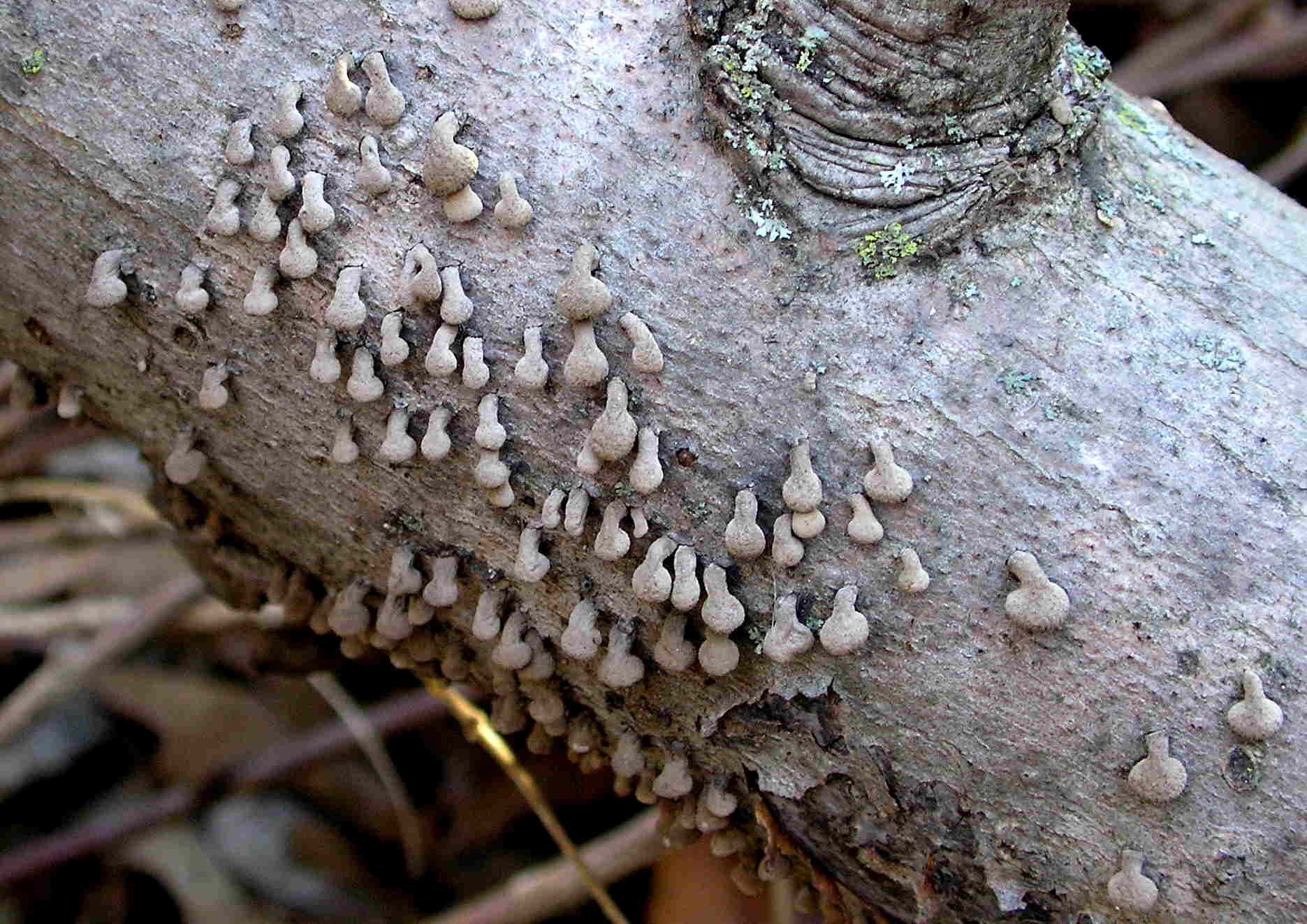
- Porodisculus pendulus

Scientific classification
- Kingdom: Fungi
- Division: Basidiomycota
- Class: Agaricomycetes
- Order: Agaricales
- Family: Fistulinaceae
- Genus: Porodisculus; Murrill (1907)

Type species
- Porodisculus pendulus (Schwein.) Schwein. (1907)

Species
- Porodisculus orientalis Porodisculus pendulus

Synonyms
- Enslinia Fr. (1835); Porodiscus Murrill (1903)

= Porodisculus =

Genus of fungi

Porodisculus is a ditypic genus of fungi in the family Fistulinaceae. It was circumscribed by American mycologist William Alphonso Murrill in 1907.
