= Protoxerula =

Scientific classification
- Kingdom: Fungi
- Division: Basidiomycota
- Class: Agaricomycetes
- Order: Agaricales
- Family: Physalacriaceae
- Genus: Protoxerula; R.H.Petersen (2010)

Type species
- Protoxerula flavo-olivacea R.H.Petersen (2010)

Synonyms
- Xerula flavo-olivacea R.H.Petersen & Halling (2008); Oudemansiella flavo-olivacea Yang et al. (2009)

Genus of fungi

Protoxerula is a fungal genus in the family Physalacriaceae. Described in 2010 by American mycologist Ron Petersen, the genus is monotypic, containing the sole species Protoxerula flavo-olivacea. This species was originally described as a Xerula in 2008 and transferred to Oudemansiella the following year before the new genus was circumscribed to accommodate it. P. flavo-olivacea is known from northeastern Australia, where it fruits singly to scattered in undisturbed rainforest, usually near plants from the genera Acacia, Agathis, and Corymbia. The variety kimberleyana, named for its type locality in the Kimberley region of Western Australia, has a greenish-cream cap colour, gills that become white and readily crumble when dry, long pseudorhiza (a cordlike structure resembling a plant root) with a hairy surface, ellipsoid basidiospores, thick-walled "hairs" (setae) on the cap surface, and a unique capitulate ("head-like") pleurocystidia.
