= Cyttarophyllopsis =

Scientific classification
- Kingdom: Fungi
- Division: Basidiomycota
- Class: Agaricomycetes
- Order: Agaricales
- Family: Bolbitiaceae
- Genus: Cyttarophyllopsis; R. Heim

Type species
- Cyttarophyllopsis cordispora R. Heim

Genus of fungi

Cyttarophyllopsis is a genus of fungi in the Bolbitiaceae family of mushrooms. This is a monotypic genus, containing the single species Cyttarophyllopsis cordispora.
