= Kauffmania =

Scientific classification
- Domain: Eukaryota
- Kingdom: Fungi
- Division: Basidiomycota
- Class: Agaricomycetes
- Order: Agaricales
- Family: Psathyrellaceae
- Genus: Kauffmania; Örstadius & E.Larss.

Genus of fungi

Kauffmania is a monotypic genus of fungi belonging to the family Psathyrellaceae. The only species is Kauffmania larga.

The species was described by Örstadius and E. Larss in 2015.
