= Tubariella =

Scientific classification
- Kingdom: Fungi
- Division: Basidiomycota
- Class: Agaricomycetes
- Order: Agaricales
- Family: Bolbitiaceae
- Genus: Tubariella; E. Horak & Hauskn.

Type species
- Tubariella rhizophora E. Horak & Hauskn.

Genus of fungi

Tubariella is a genus of fungi in the Bolbitiaceae family of mushrooms. This is a monotypic genus, containing the single species Tubariella rhizophora, found growing on rotten wood in Papua New Guinea.
