= Tubariopsis =

Scientific classification
- Kingdom: Fungi
- Division: Basidiomycota
- Class: Agaricomycetes
- Order: Agaricales
- Family: Bolbitiaceae
- Genus: Tubariopsis; R. Heim

Type species
- Tubariopsis torquipes R. Heim

Genus of fungi

Tubariopsis is a genus of fungi in the Bolbitiaceae family of mushrooms. This is a monotypic genus, containing the single species Tubariopsis torquipes.
