= Melanomphalia =

Scientific classification
- Kingdom: Fungi
- Division: Basidiomycota
- Class: Agaricomycetes
- Order: Agaricales
- Family: Tricholomataceae
- Genus: Melanomphalia; M.P.Christ.

Type species
- Melanomphalia nigrescens M.P.Christ.

Genus of fungi

Melanomphalia is a genus of fungi in the family Tricholomataceae. The genus is monotypic, containing the single species Melanomphalia nigrescens, found in Europe. The species was first described by M.P. Christensen in 1936.

== See also ==
- List of Tricholomataceae genera
