= Trichocybe =

Scientific classification
- Kingdom: Fungi
- Division: Basidiomycota
- Class: Agaricomycetes
- Order: Agaricales
- Family: incertae sedis
- Genus: Trichocybe; Vizzini
- Species: T. puberula

Binomial name
- Trichocybe puberula (Kuyper) Vizzini

Synonyms
- Clitocybe puberula Kuyper (1983)

Genus of fungi

Trichocybe is a genus of fungi in the order Agaricales. It is incertae sedis with respect to familial placement within the order. The genus was created in 2010 to contain the species Trichocybe puberula, originally described as a Clitocybe by Thom Kuyper in 1983.
