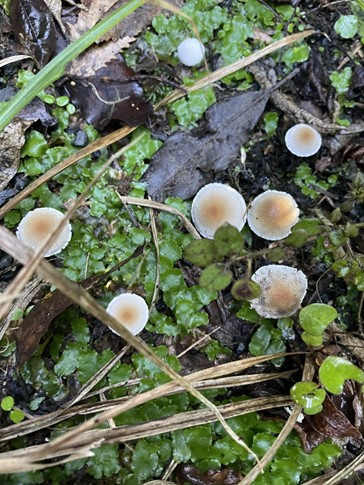

Scientific classification
- Kingdom: Fungi
- Division: Basidiomycota
- Class: Agaricomycetes
- Order: Agaricales
- Family: Bolbitiaceae
- Genus: Tympanella; E. Horak
- Species: T. galanthina

Binomial name
- Tympanella galanthina E. Horak

Synonyms
- Agaricus galanthinus Cooke & Massee; Naucoria galanthina (Cooke & Massee) Sacc.

= Tympanella galanthina =

Species of fungus

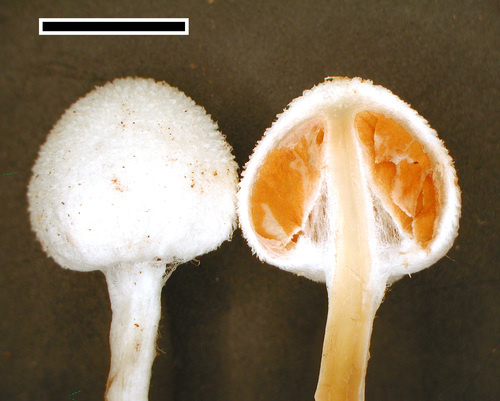
Tympanella galanthina

Tympanella galanthina, or cottonbud pouch, is a secotioid fungus in the monotypic genus Tympanella, a member of the Bolbitiaceae family. It is endemic to New Zealand.

== Etymology ==
Tympanella, derived from the Latin Tympanum meaning little drum or stretched and -ella meaning small.

The specific epithet galanthina is possibly derived from the Greek, Γαλα = milk, ανθοσ = flower, and the adjectival ending, -ιον; possibly referring to similarities to the snowdrop, Galanthus.

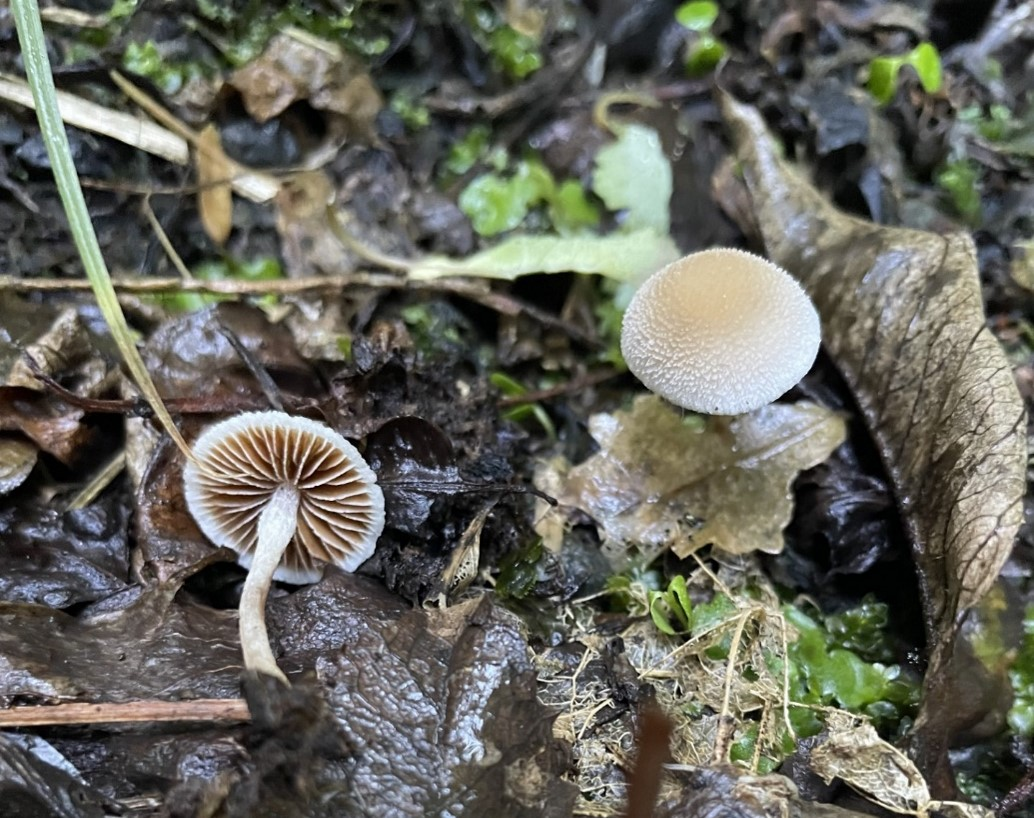
Tympanella galanthina

== Taxonomy ==
Mordecai Cubitt Cooke and George Edward Massee first described the species as Agaricus galanthinus in 1890. The species was described as Naucoria galanthina in 1891 by Pier Andrea Saccardo. The genus Tympanella was re-described by mycologist Egon Horak in 1971. The holotype specimen was collected by Mordecai Cubitt Cooke and George Edward Massee in New Zealand in 1890.

== Description ==
The pileus of Tympanella galanthina is dry, and 7–30 mm diameter. It is secotioid and globose when young. Later in development the pileus may become convex or campanulate, however, the margin is still strongly incurved. The colour varies and can be white, cream, clay, or buff. The pileus is densely squamulose, with small hairs or scales. There are fibrillose remnants of the veil near the margin, white and conspicuous particularly on young fruit bodies. The lamellae are a distinct rust to cinnamon brown, not lacunose or anastomosing, adnate or adnexed, sometimes subdecurrent and floccose with a coloured edge. The cylindrical stipe is also dry and is typically 10–40 mm tall and 1.5–5 mm wide. It is light brown, concolourus with the pileus and has white fibrils down from the veil. This species does not have a permanent cortina or ring and columella is absent /not attenuated near the apex. The stipe is singularly fistulose, watery brown context without smell or taste.

The spores are smooth, elliptical, and thick-walled, 10.4–13.5 × 6.3–8 μ. The spores have a germ pore and are reddish-brown, but are not amyloid or dextrinoid. The basidia are 27–36 × 8–11 μ with 4 spores. The cheilocystidia are 15–45 × 12–25 μ and are thin-walled, hyaline, clavate or lageniform with a sterile zone at the edge. Cylindrical or fusoid hyphae form a cuticle, a trichoderm (5–20 μ diam.) which is thin walled, gelatinised, without pigment, and has suberect tips and clamp connections.

== Habitat and distribution ==
Tympanella galanthina is found in New Zealand forests among leaf litter or fallen tree fern fronds, and occasionally on rotting wood. It prefers wet forest conditions and is distributed over the North and South Islands. It has been found in association with Beilschmiedia tawa, Sphaeropteris medullaris, Leptospermum scoparium, Nothofagus fusca, N. menziesii, N. solandri, and with Podocarpus.
