= Hemigaster =

Scientific classification
- Kingdom: Fungi
- Division: Basidiomycota
- Class: Agaricomycetes
- Order: Agaricales
- Family: Hemigasteraceae
- Genus: Hemigaster; Juel (1895)
- Species: H. candidus

Binomial name
- Hemigaster candidus Juel (1895)

Genus of fungi

Hemigaster is a genus of fungi in the order Agaricales. The only species is Hemigaster candidus.
