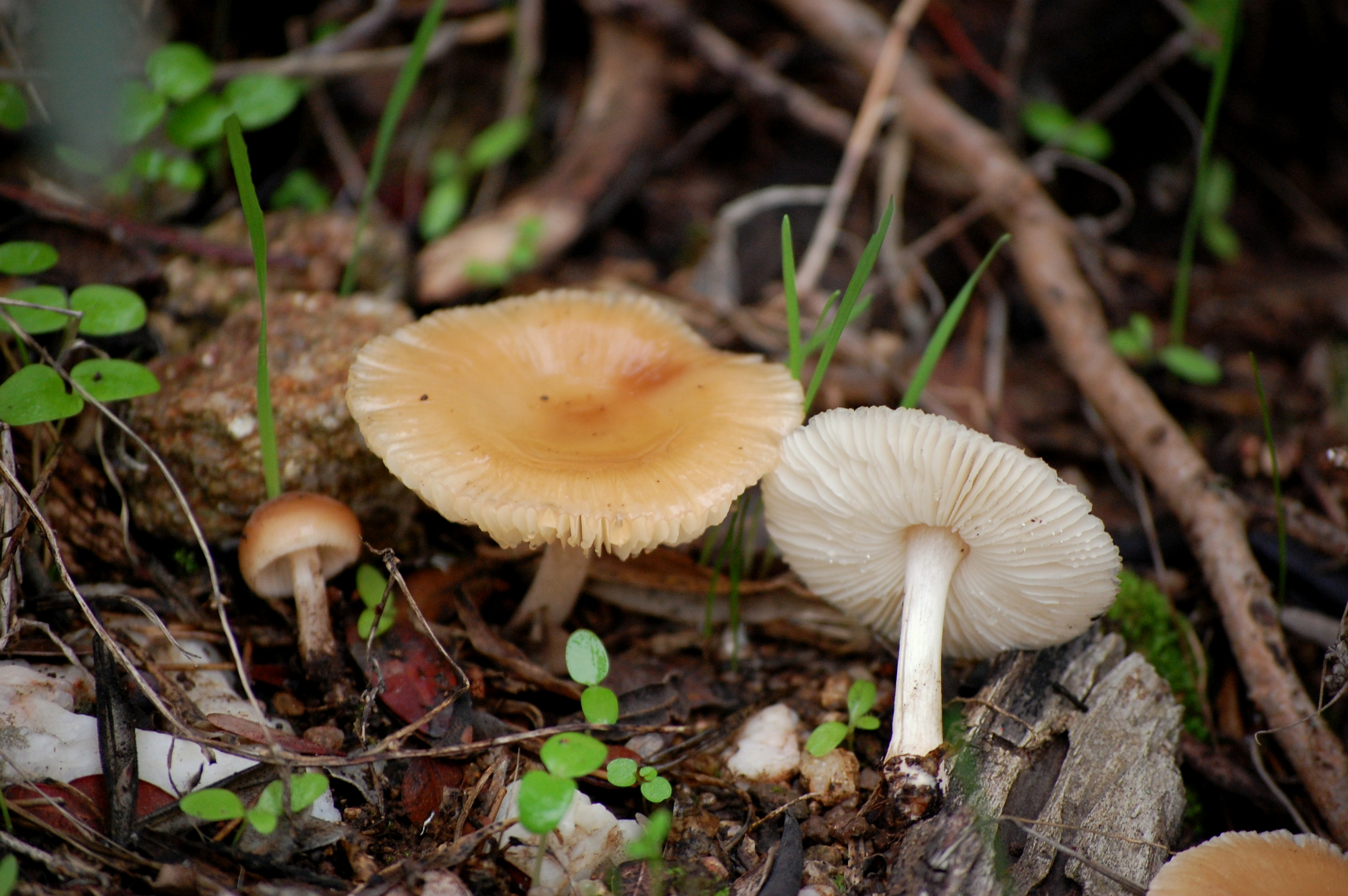
- Leucoinocybe lenta

Scientific classification
- Kingdom: Fungi
- Division: Basidiomycota
- Class: Agaricomycetes
- Order: Agaricales
- Family: Tricholomataceae
- Genus: Leucoinocybe; Singer ex Antonín, Borovička, Holec & Kolařík (2019)

Type species
- Leucoinocybe lenta (Maire) Antonín, Borovička, Holec & Kolařík (2019)

Synonyms
- Mycena lenta Maire (1928); Collybia lenta (Maire) Maire (1933); Clitocybula lenta (Maire) Malençon & Bertault (1975)

= Leucoinocybe =

Genus of fungi

Leucoinocybe is a fungal genus in the family Tricholomataceae. This genus is known to contain 3 species: Leucoinocybe lenta and Leucoinocybe taniae, found in Europe, and Leucoinocybe sulcata found in India.

== See also ==
- List of Tricholomataceae genera
