= Christopher Edmund Broome =

British mycologist (1812–1886)

- Born: 24 July 1812; Berkhamsted, Hertfordshire
- Died: 15 November 1886 (aged 74)
- Known for: Contributions to taxonomic mycology
- Scientific career
- Fields: Mycology
- Author abbrev. (botany): Broome

Christopher Edmund Broome (24 July 1812 – 15 November 1886) was a British mycologist. The standard author abbreviation Broome is used to indicate this person as the author when citing a botanical name.

== Background and education ==
C.E. Broome was born in Berkhamsted, the son of a solicitor. He was privately schooled in Kensington and in 1832 was sent to read for Holy Orders with the curate of Swaffham Prior in Cambridgeshire. "Conscientious scruples" prevented him from entering the ministry, however, and later the same year he enrolled at Trinity Hall, Cambridge where he completed his degree in 1836. He married Charlotte Horman the following year and the couple lived at Rudloe Cottage, near Box, then at Wraxall Lodge, Clifton, and finally (in 1848) at Elmhurst, near Batheaston, where he remained for the rest of his life.

== Researches in mycology ==
Broome became interested in natural history whilst at Swaffham Prior and later, with his friend G.H.K. Thwaites, in Clifton. He developed an expertise in fungi, sending many of his collections to the Rev. M.J. Berkeley. Together, Berkeley and Broome published a series of "Notices of British Fungi" over a 37-year period, jointly describing no less than 550 new species. The two mycologists also collaborated on descriptions of fungi collected in Sri Lanka by Thwaites and on collections from Brisbane, Australia. Broome published little on his own, mainly accounts of local fungi from Somerset and Wiltshire. His particular interest was in truffles and truffle-like fungi, but he collected widely and carefully. On his death, his herbarium contained some 40,000 fungal specimens, which are now at the Royal Botanic Gardens, Kew. His botanical specimens and library were willed to the Bath Royal Literary & Scientific Institution, where they remain.

Broome became a fellow of the Linnean Society in 1866. The fungal genera Broomeia and Broomella were named after him, together with over a dozen fungal species, including Nectriopsis broomeana, Nitschkia broomeana, Ramaria broomei, and the truffle-like Melanogaster broomeanus.

== Selected publications ==
- Berkeley, M.J. & Broome, C.E. (1850). Notices of British fungi. Annals and Magazine of Natural History Ser. 2, 5: 455–466.
- Berkeley, M.J. & Broome, C.E. (1871). The fungi of Ceylon. Journal of the Linnean Society Botany 11: 469–572.
- Berkeley, M.J. & Broome, C.E. (1880). List of fungi from Brisbane, Queensland with descriptions of new species. Transactions of the Linnean Society of London Ser. 2, 1.
- Broome, C.E. (1864). The fungi of Wiltshire. The Wiltshire archaeological and natural history magazine 8: 170–198.
- Broome, C.E. (1870). Remarks on some of the fungi met with in the neighbourhood of Bath. Proceedings of the Bath Natural History and Antiquarian Field Club 2: 55–98.

== See also ==
- List of mycologists
- Category:Taxa named by Christopher Edmund Broome
