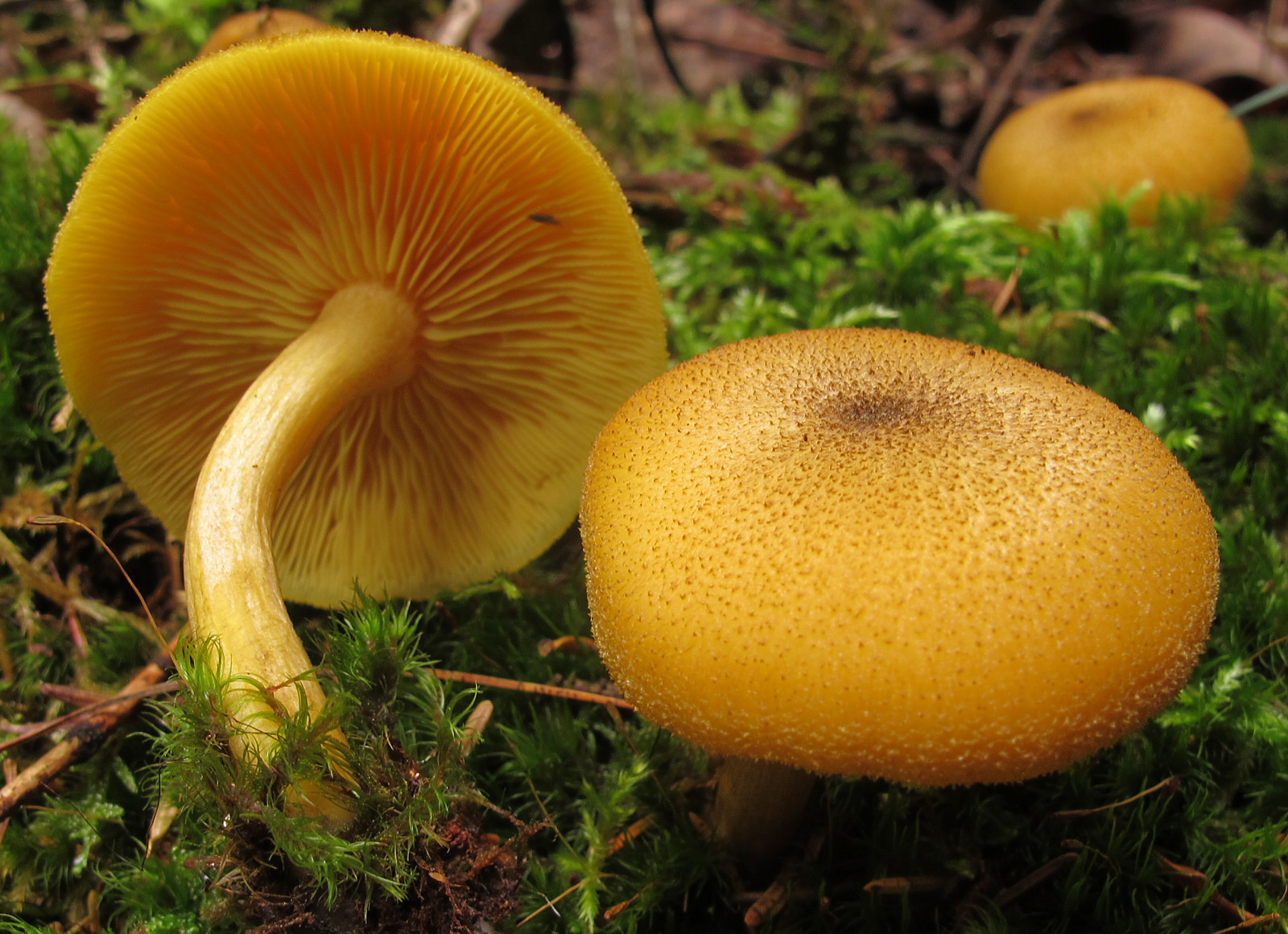

Scientific classification
- Kingdom: Fungi
- Division: Basidiomycota
- Class: Agaricomycetes
- Order: Agaricales
- Family: Phyllotopsidaceae
- Genus: Tricholomopsis
- Species: T. decora

Binomial name
- Tricholomopsis decora (Fr.) Singer 1939

Synonyms
- Agaricus decorus Fr.1821; Clitocybe decora (Fr.) Gillet, 1874; Cortinellus decorus (Fr.) P. Karst., 1879; Tricholoma decorum (Fr.) Quél., 1883; Gyrophila decora (Fr.) Quél., 1886; Pleurotus decorus (Fr.) Sacc., 1887; Dendrosarcus decorus (Fr.) Kuntze, 1898; Tricholoma rutilans var. decorum (Fr.) Maire, 1916

= Tricholomopsis decora =

Species of fungus

Tricholomopsis decora
- Mycological characteristics
- Gills on hymenium
- Cap is convex or depressed
- Hymenium is adnate
- Stipe is bare
- Spore print is white
- Ecology is saprotrophic
- Edibility is unknown

Tricholomopsis decora, commonly known as prunes and custard, is a species of gilled mushroom in the genus Tricholomopsis. It occurs in North America and Britain.

== Description ==
The cap is 2–5.5 centimetres (3/4–2 1/4 in) wide. The gills are mostly adnate. The stem is up to 5.5 cm long and 9 millimetres (1/4 in) thick. The flesh is yellow and the spore print is white. It is regarded as nonpoisonous.

=== Similar species ===
It resembles T. sulfureoides (and others within its genus), Callistosporium luteo-olivaceum, and Chysomphalina chrysophylla.

== Distribution and habitat ==
It occurs in North America (until October) and in Britain, growing in conifer forests.

== Gallery ==
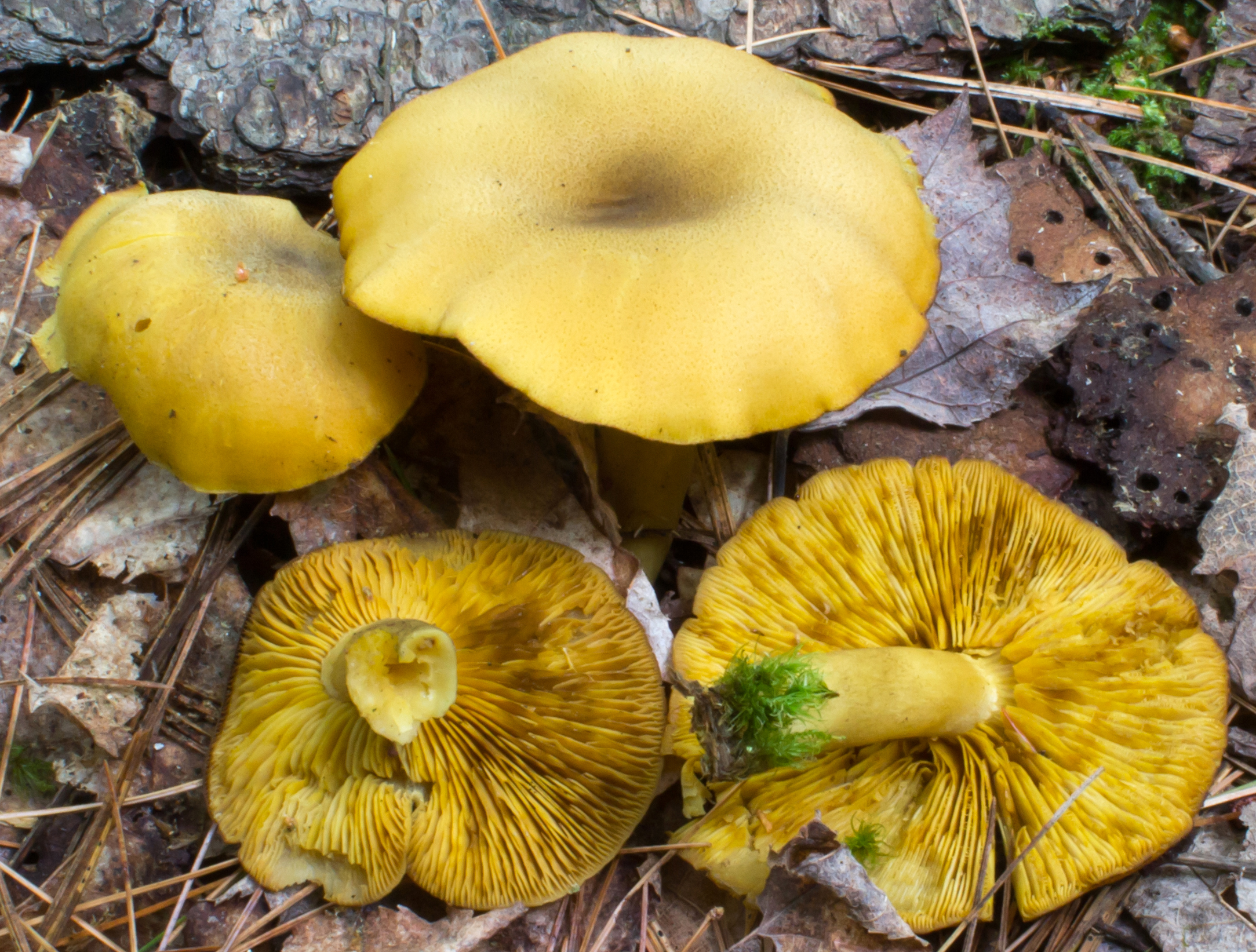

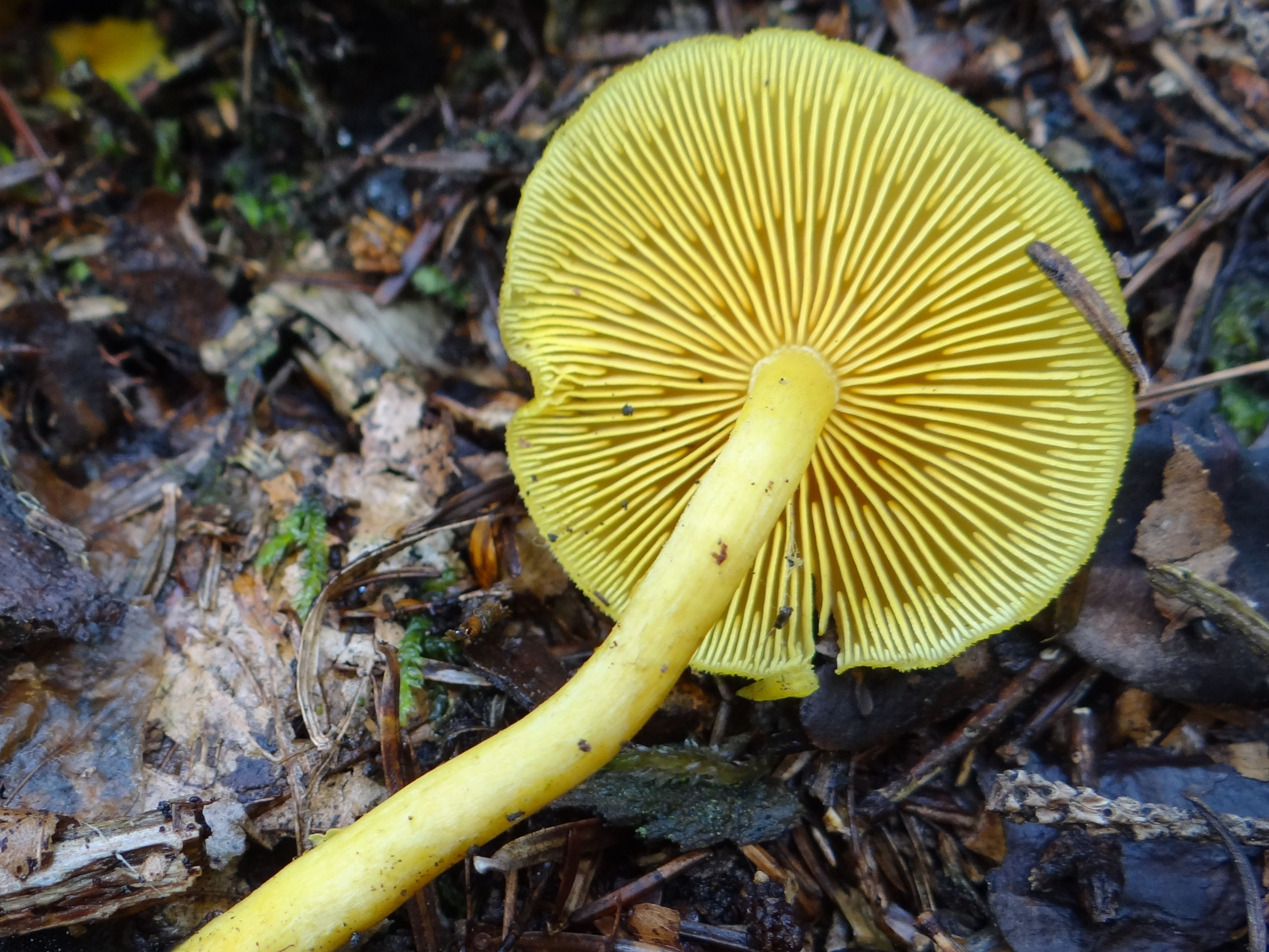

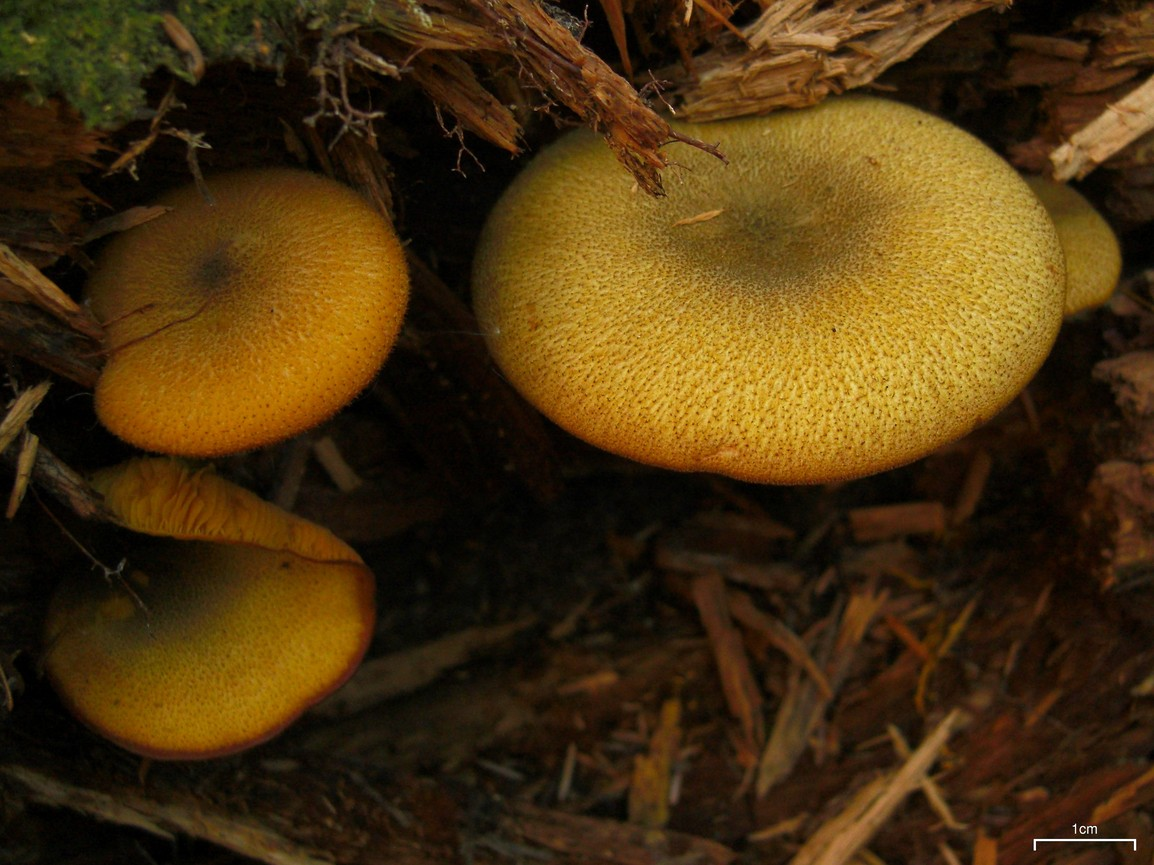

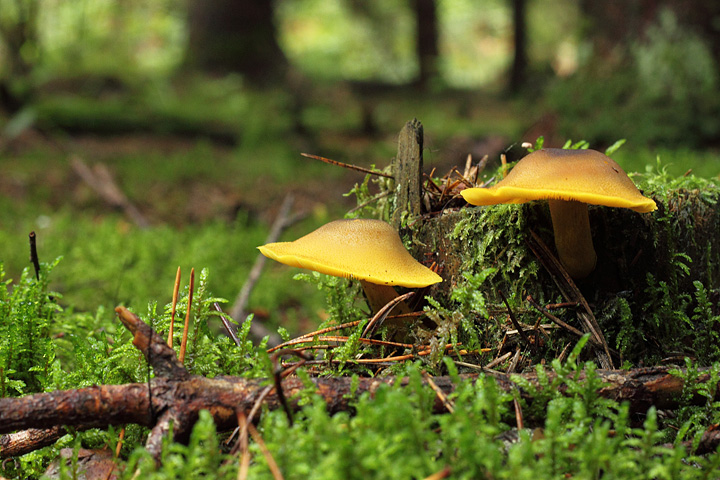

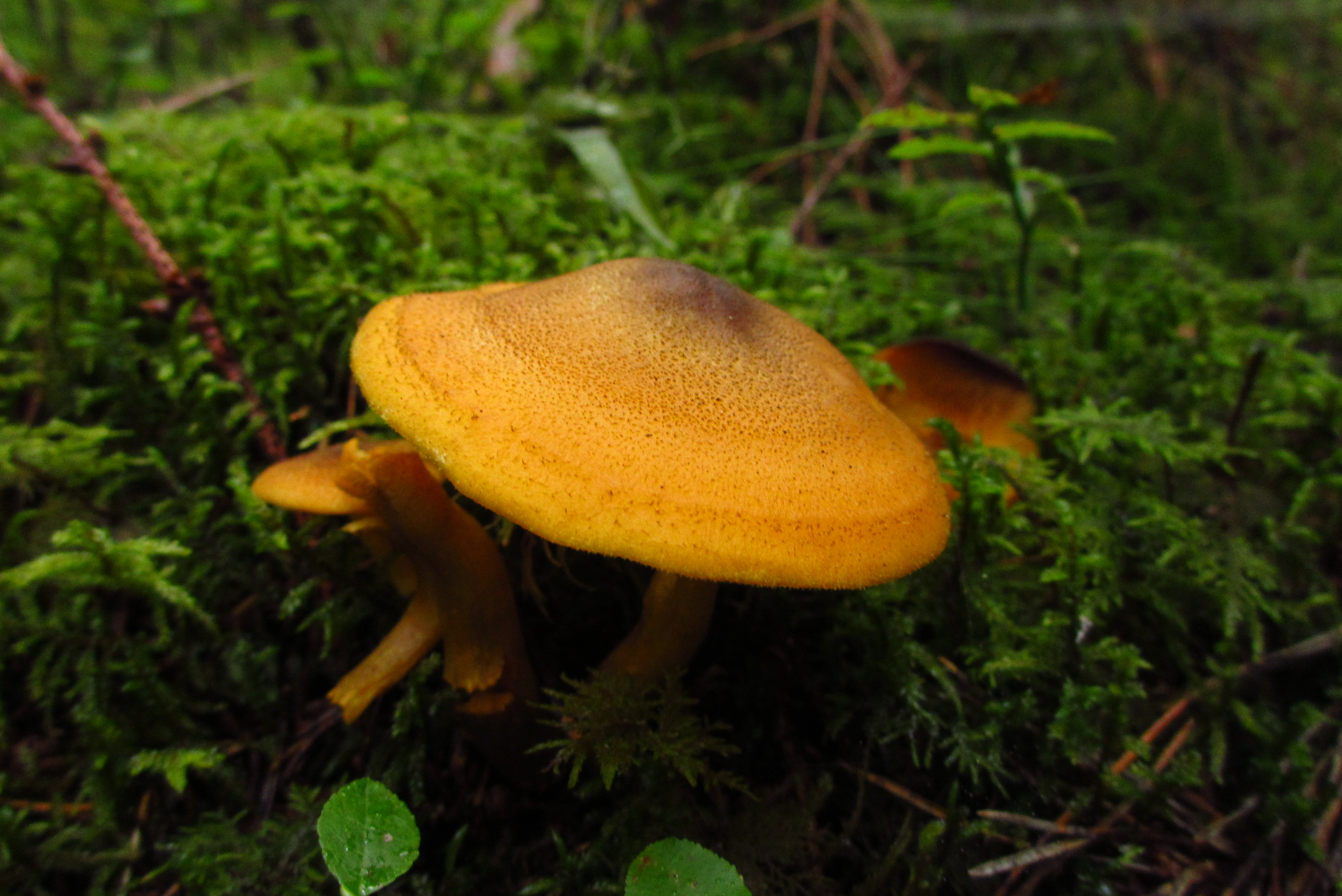

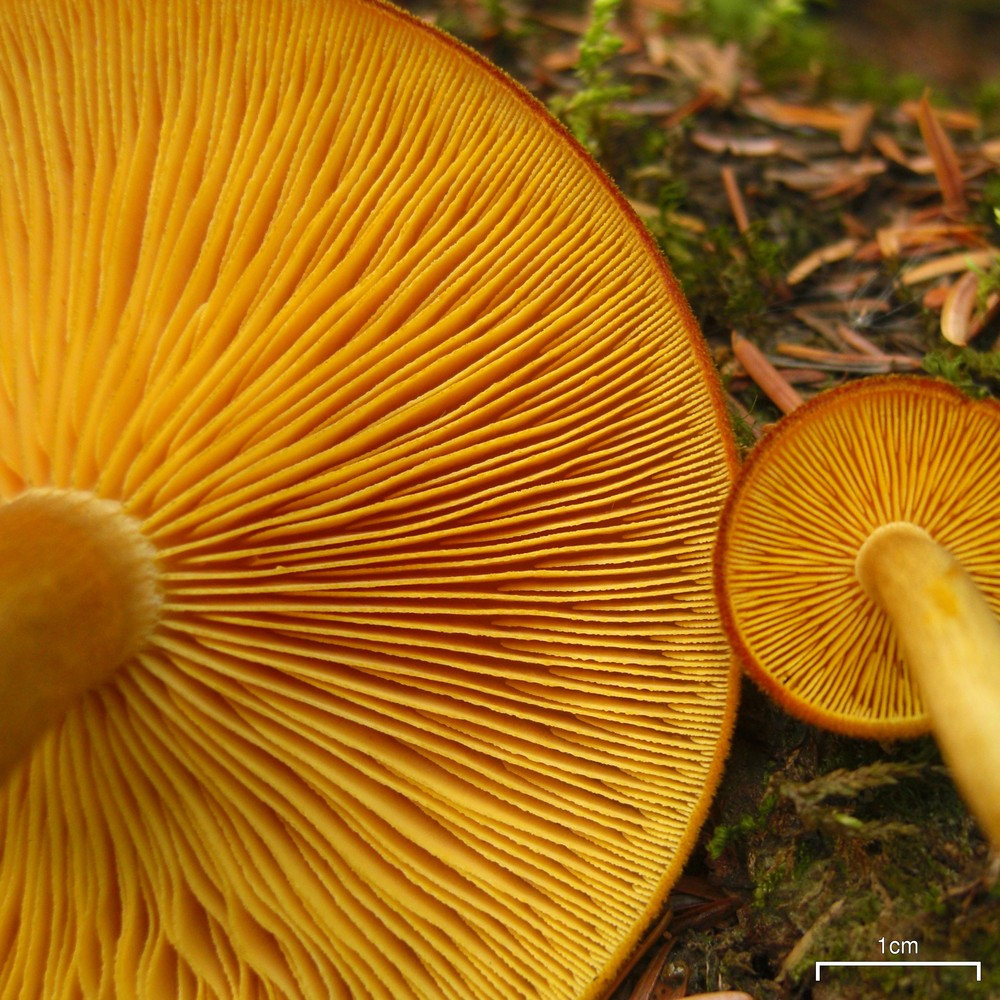
