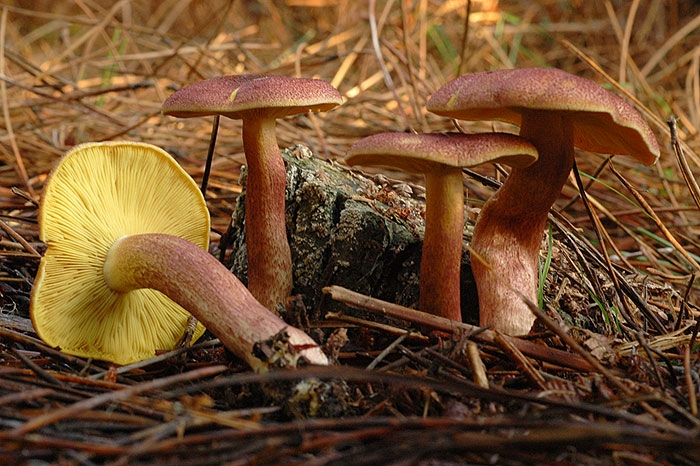
- Tricholomopsis rutilans Pine woods, Galicia

Scientific classification
- Kingdom: Fungi
- Division: Basidiomycota
- Class: Agaricomycetes
- Order: Agaricales
- Family: Phyllotopsidaceae
- Genus: Tricholomopsis
- Species: T. rutilans

Binomial name
- Tricholomopsis rutilans (Schaeff. : Fr.) Sing.

= Tricholomopsis rutilans =

Species of fungus

Tricholomopsis rutilans
- Mycological characteristics
- Gills on hymenium
- Cap is convex
- Hymenium is adnate
- Stipe is bare
- Spore print is cream
- Ecology is saprotrophic
- Edibility is edible, but unpalatable

Tricholomopsis rutilans, commonly known as plums and custard, or red-haired agaric, is a species of gilled mushroom found across Europe and North America.

== Description ==
The common name stems from the plum-red scaled cap and custard-yellow gills. The cap is convex, becoming bell-shaped then flattening with age. It is up to 12 centimetres (4 1/2 in) wide with an incurved margin, densely covered with red to purplish red hairs; with maturity the hairs bunch into small scales and the yellowish color beneath shows through. A KOH test produces red on cap surface.

The gills are adnate, yellow, and close with many short gills. The stem is 5–11 cm (2–4 1/4 in) tall, 8–25 mm (3/8–1 in) thick with a red scaly base fading to yellow towards the gills. In age it may be entirely yellow.

The flesh is yellow to cream-coloured and spore print creamy white. The spores are cream colored, 5–7 x 3–5 μm, almost globe shaped to broadly ellipsoid, smooth, and clear like glass in KOH.

The basidia have 4 protrusions, the cheilocystidia 50–70+ x 20–25 μm; shaped like a ball on a stick to sack shaped or swollen-irregular, smooth, thin-walled, clear in KOH. Pleurocystidia scattered, 30-35 x 5–7 μm, flask shaped to almost cylindrical, smooth, clear in KOH.

=== Similar species ===
A related species, Tricholomopsis decora, is also found in conifer woods but is golden in colour, much less common and found at higher altitudes. T. flammula is smaller and has a yellower stem. Megacollybia fallax is similar but with a gray-brown cap. Gymnopilus luteofolius grows in clusters and with scales on the cap.

== Distribution and habitat ==
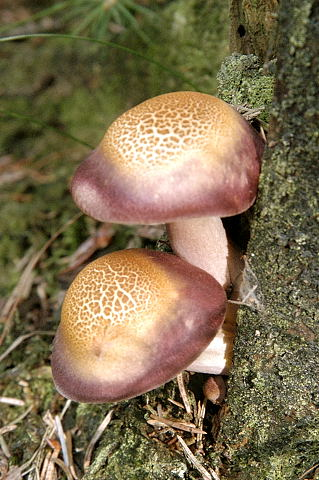
Growing in Belgium

Tricholomopsis rutilans can be found growing on tree stumps and logs (especially those of spruce) in coniferous woodlands throughout the northern hemisphere, in places as diverse as Ireland, Bulgaria, Ukraine and northwest Russia, in late summer and autumn (June until November). It has also been found, probably accidentally introduced, in Australia, Aotearoa New Zealand and Costa Rica on introduced pine trees.

It is saprobic on the well-decayed wood of conifers, also occasionally reported in woodchips, sawdust, and lignin-rich soil. It grows alone, scattered or gregariously, and is widely distributed in North America.

== Edibility ==
Many older texts list T. rutilans as apparently able to be eaten after boiling, though not recommended. A couple of more recent books list it as of poor quality, reportedly due to a taste of rotting wood.
