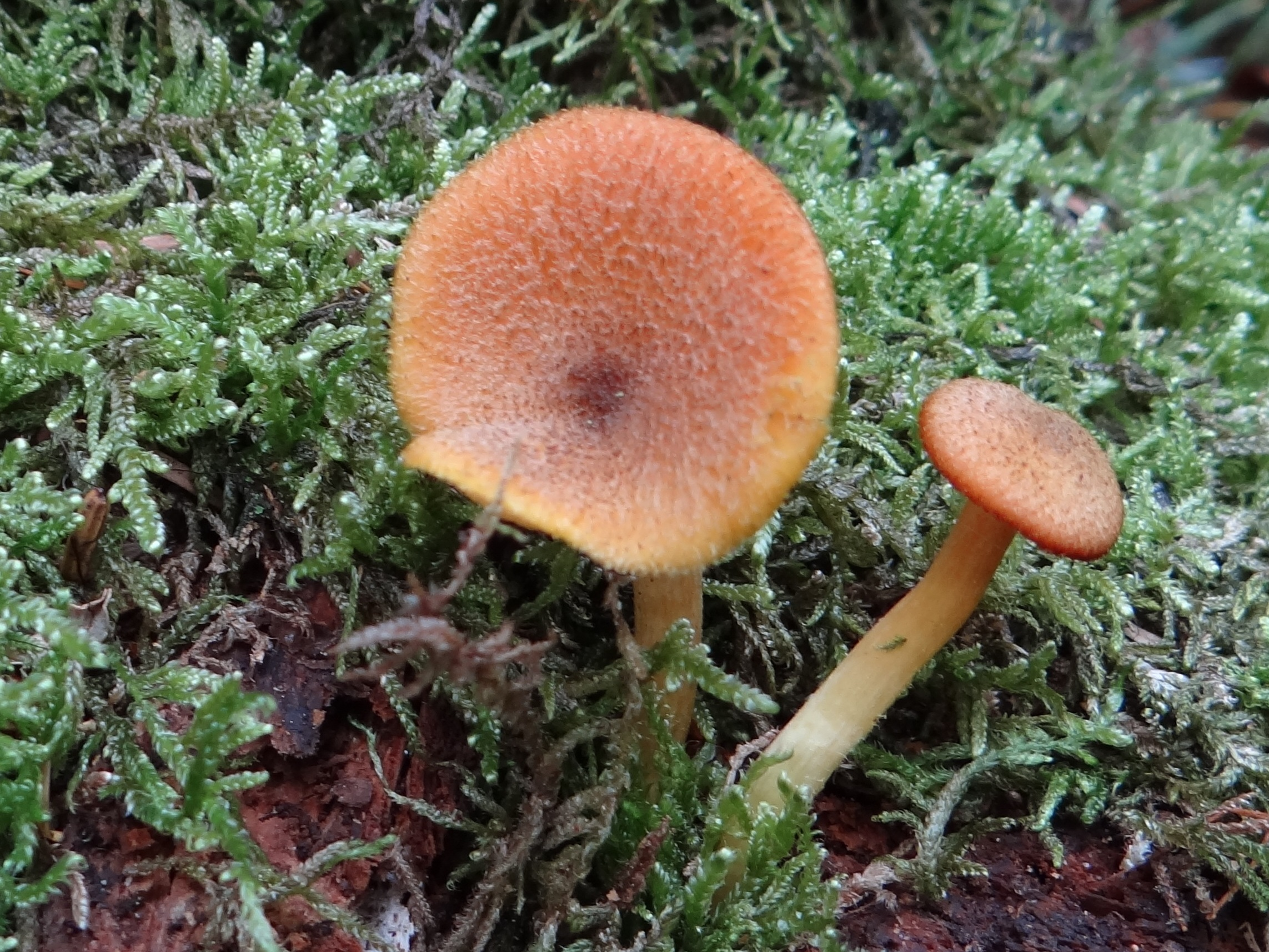

Scientific classification
- Domain: Eukaryota
- Kingdom: Fungi
- Division: Basidiomycota
- Class: Agaricomycetes
- Order: Agaricales
- Family: Phyllotopsidaceae
- Genus: Tricholomopsis
- Species: T. ornata

Binomial name
- Tricholomopsis ornata (Fr.) Singer 1943

Synonyms
- Agaricus ornatus Fr., 1838; Tricholoma ornatum (Fr.) Quél., 1878; Pleurotus ornatus (Fr.) Sacc., 1887; Dendrosarcus ornatus (Fr.) Kuntze, 1898

= Tricholomopsis ornata =

Species of fungus

Tricholomopsis ornata is a species of Tricholomopsis from Europe.

== Gallery ==
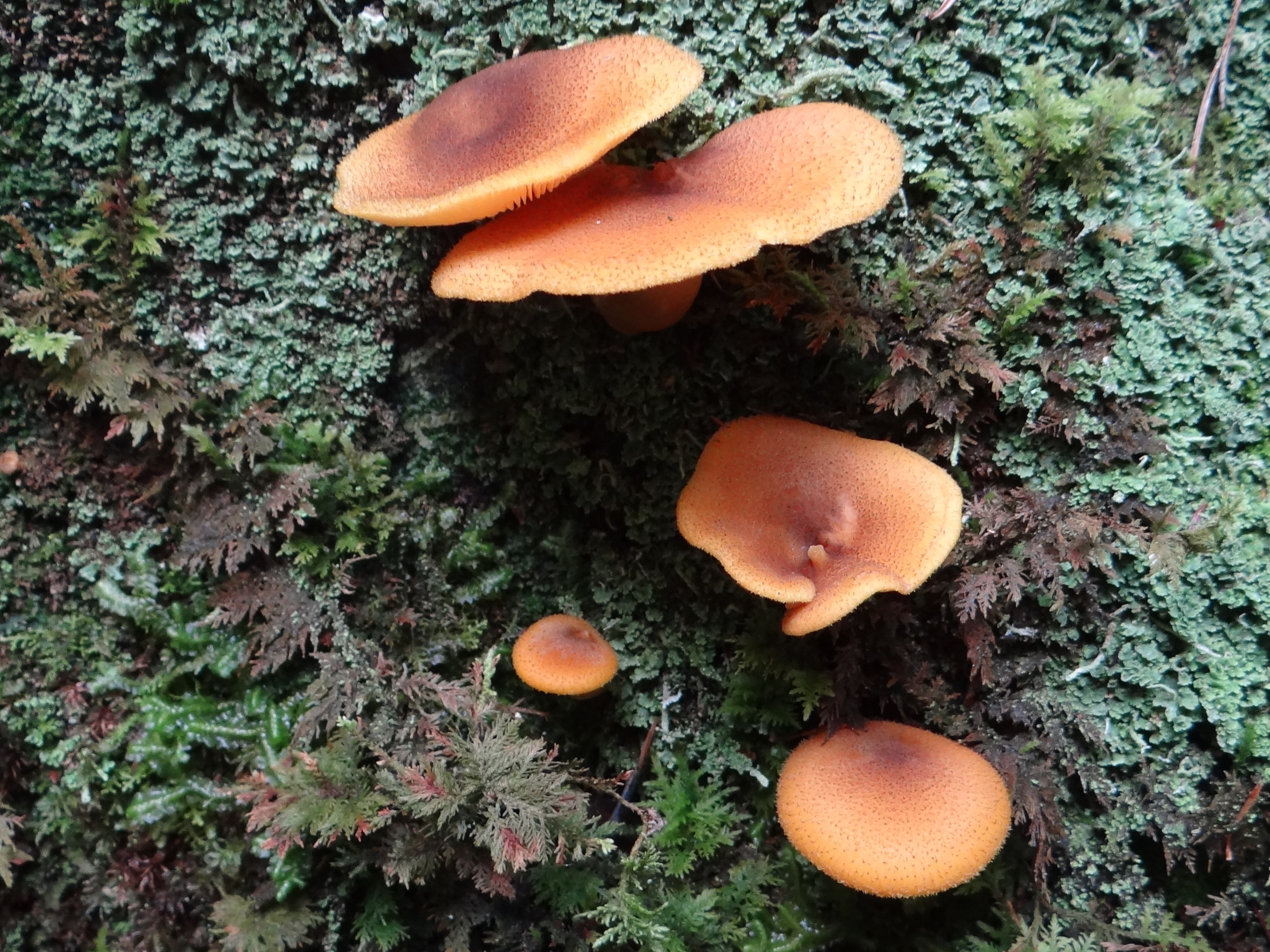

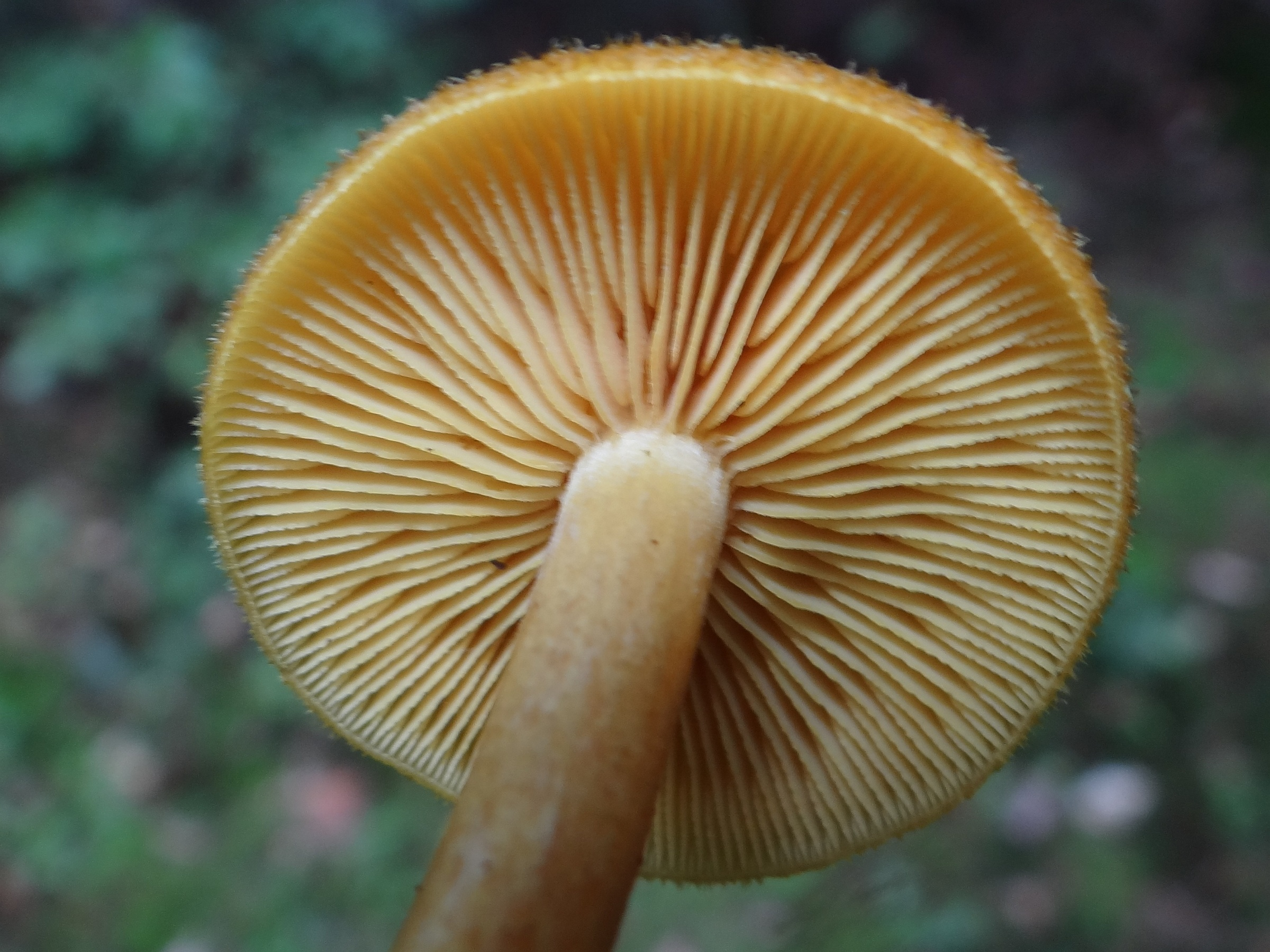

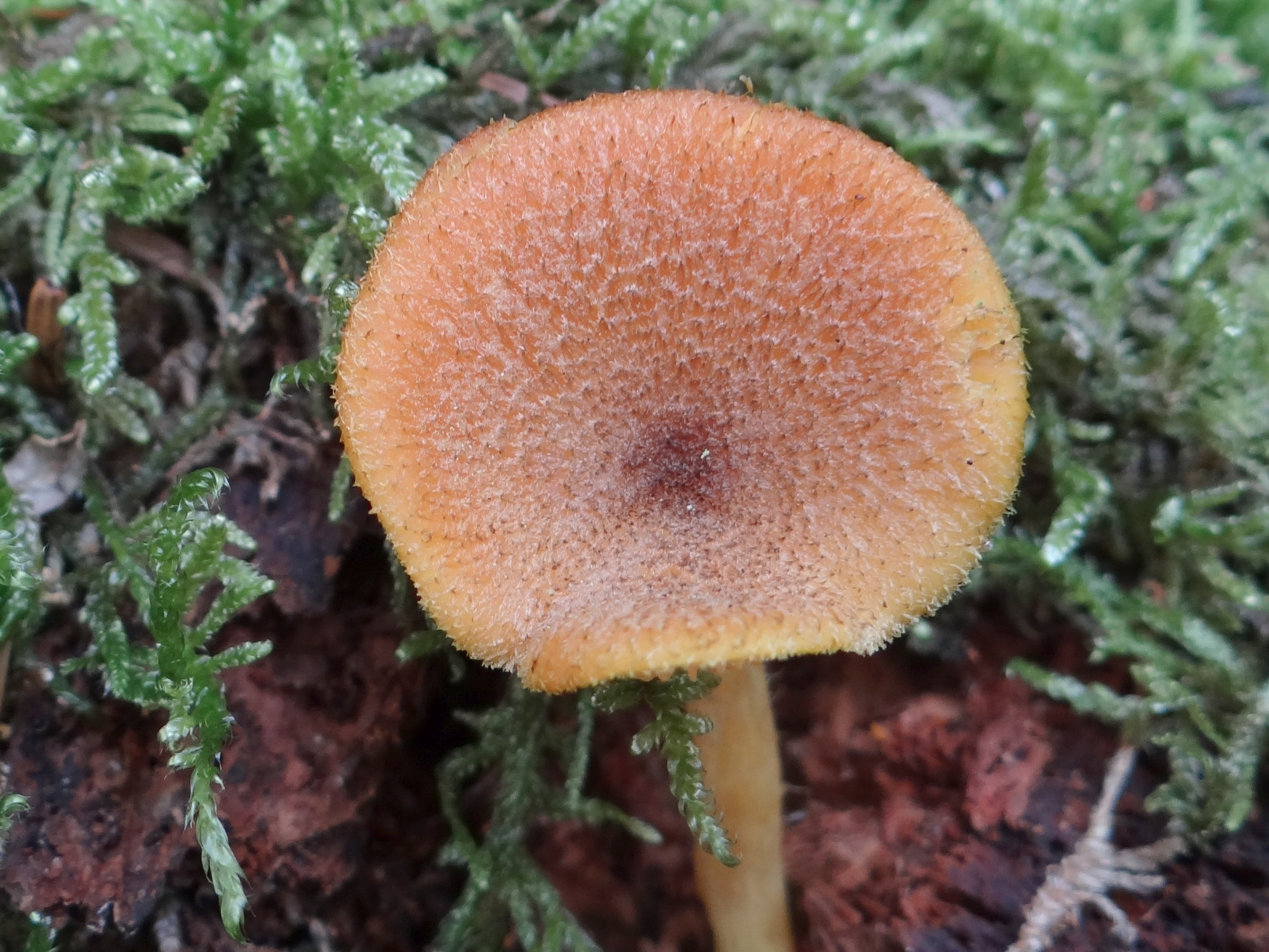
