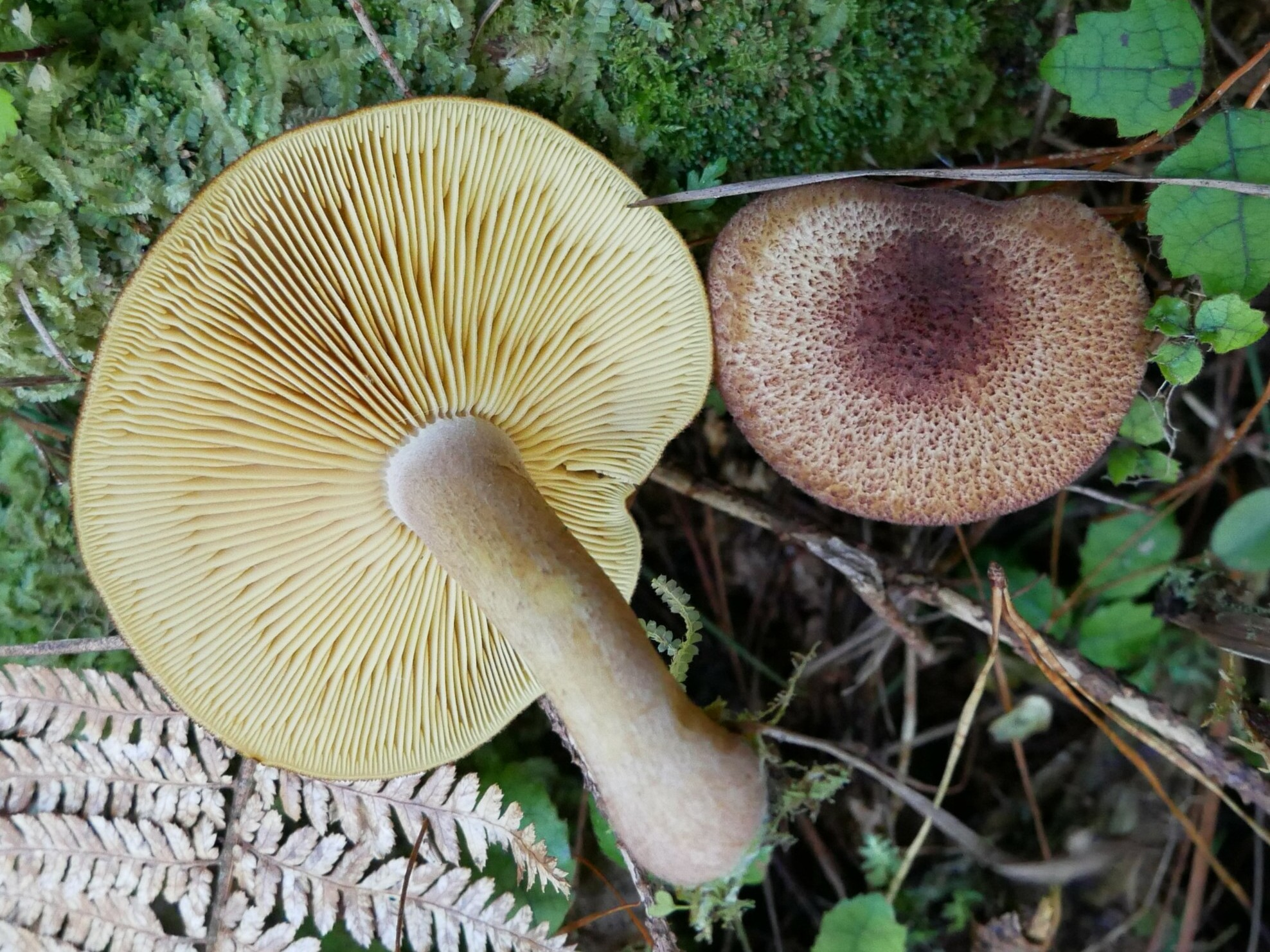
- Tricholomopsis ornaticeps fruiting bodies

Scientific classification
- Kingdom: Fungi
- Division: Basidiomycota
- Class: Agaricomycetes
- Order: Agaricales
- Family: Phyllotopsidaceae
- Genus: Tricholomopsis
- Species: T. ornaticeps

Binomial name
- Tricholomopsis ornaticeps G.Stev. (E.Horak) (1971)

Synonyms
- Tricholoma ornaticeps G.Stev. (1964)

= Tricholomopsis ornaticeps =

Species of fungus

Tricholomopsis ornaticeps
- Mycological characteristics
- Gills on hymenium
- Cap is depressed or flat
- Hymenium is sinuate
- Spore print is white
- Ecology is saprotrophic
- Edibility is unknown

Tricholomopsis ornaticeps is a species of mushroom of the family Phyllotopsidaceae. It was first described by New Zealand mycologist Greta Stevenson in 1964. The species was moved to the genus Tricholomopsis in 1971 by Egon Horak. The fungus is native to New Zealand, where it is saprotrophic and found growing on wood. Its fruiting bodies have been recorded in both native forests and introduced conifer plantations of Pinus radiata and Larix.

== Taxonomy ==
The species was first described by New Zealand mycologist Greta Stevenson in 1964 as Tricholoma ornaticeps. The species was moved to the genus Tricholomopsis in 1971 by Egon Horak. The name, Tricholomopsis ornaticeps, was supported by Cooper & Park (2016). A 2020 study found that T. ornaticeps was closely related to T. rubroaurantiaca, T. sasae, and T. scabra based on phylogenetic comparisons with specimens of these species from China and New Zealand. A 2024 study instead found that T. ornaticeps and T. scabra, both New Zealand species, might need to be categorised in a different clade (group), and the phylogeny needs further study.

== Description ==
The fruit bodies (basidiocarps) of T. ornaticeps have caps (pilei) which reach 7–8 centimetres (2.8–3.1 inches) in diameter. They are ochraceous to saffron-yellow in colour, and densely covered with minute brown fibrillose scales. They are convex with a downward-curved margin, becoming centrally depressed with age. The lamella (gills) are yellow and they stain brown at the edges. They are moderately distant and sinuate. The stipe measures 3 × 1 cm in length and width. It is creamy at the apex and ochraceous at the base, with a fibrillose to striate surface. The spore print is white. The spores are oval to nearly cylindrical in shape, thin-walled, and measure 8.3 μm × 4.3 μm. The basidia measure 20–40 × 8–10 μm. The hyphae measure about 5 μm in diameter.

== Distribution and habitat ==
Tricholomopsis ornaticeps is native to New Zealand. Its range covers the North and South Islands. Tricholomopsis species are primarily saprotrophic, meaning they obtain nutrients by breaking down organic material. T. ornaticeps has been recorded in Nothofagus forests, as well as in introduced conifer plantations of Pinus radiata and Larix species. T. ornaticeps has been recorded growing on wood from both angiosperms and conifers.

== Works cited ==
Journals

- Cooper, Jerry A.; Park, Duckchul (2016). "The Fungal Genus Tricholomopsis (Agaricales) in New Zealand, Including Tricholomopsis scabra sp. nov". Phytotaxa. 288 (1). Magnolia Press. doi:10.11646/phytotaxa.288.1.7. ISSN 1179-3163.
- Horak, E. (1971). "A Contribution Towards the Revision of the Agaricales (Fungi) From New Zealand". New Zealand Journal of Botany. 9 (3): 402–462. doi:10.1080/0028825X.1971.10430193. ISSN 0028-825X.
- Hosen, Md. Iqbal; Xu, Jun-Yan; Li, Ting; Gates, Genevieve; Li, Tai-Hui (2020). "Tricholomopsis rubroaurantiaca, A New Species of Tricholomataceae from Southern China". Mycoscience. 61 (6). The Mycological Society of Japan: 342–347. doi:10.1016/j.myc.2020.06.005. ISSN 1340-3540.
- McKenzie, E. H. C.; Buchanan, P. K.; Johnston, P. R. (2000). "Checklist of Fungi on Nothofagus Species in New Zealand". New Zealand Journal of Botany. 38 (4): 635–720. doi:10.1080/0028825X.2000.9512711. ISSN 0028-825X.
- Segedin, Barbara P.; Pennycook, S. R. (2001). "A Nomenclatural Checklist of Agarics, Boletes, and Related Secotioid and Gasteromycetous Fungi Recorded from New Zealand". New Zealand Journal of Botany. 39 (2): 285–348. doi:10.1080/0028825X.2001.9512739. ISSN 0028-825X.
- Stevenson, Greta (1964). "The Agaricales of New Zealand: V". Kew Bulletin. 19 (1). [Springer, Royal Botanic Gardens, Kew]: 1–59. ISSN 0075-5974. JSTOR 4108283.
- Wang, Geng-Shen; Cai, Qing; Hao, Yan-Jia; Bau, Tolgor; Chen, Zuo-Hong; Li, Mei-Xiang; David, Navarro; Kraisitudomsook, Nattapol; Yang, Zhu-Liang (2024). "Phylogenetic and Taxonomic Updates of Agaricales, With an Emphasis on Tricholomopsis". Mycology. 15 (2): 180–209. doi:10.1080/21501203.2023.2263031. ISSN 2150-1203.
- Wang, Gengshen; Guo, Ting; Chen, Xuan; Liao, Jinpeng; Ma, Yunrui; Huang, Cong; Li, Cuixin (2026). "Two New Species of Tricholomopsis (Agaricales) from China Based on Molecular Phylogenetic and Morphological Evidence". MycoKeys. 131: 235–249. doi:10.3897/mycokeys.131.185587. ISSN 1314-4049.
