= Pleurocybella ohiae =

Scientific classification
- Domain: Eukaryota
- Kingdom: Fungi
- Division: Basidiomycota
- Class: Agaricomycetes
- Order: Agaricales
- Family: Phyllotopsidaceae
- Genus: Pleurocybella
- Species: P. ohiae

Binomial name
- Pleurocybella ohiae Desjardin & Hemmes (2011)
- Known only from Hawaii

Species of fungus

Pleurocybella ohiae is a species of agaric fungus in the family Phyllotopsidaceae. Newly described to science in 2011, it is known only from Hawaiian montane wet forests.

== Taxonomy ==
The species was first described scientifically by Dennis Desjardin and Don Hemmes in 2011 in Mycologia. They considered the fruit body morphology similar to those produced by species in the genera Campanella and Cheimonophyllum, but used microscopic morphology for placement in Pleurocybella. The specific epithet ohiae refers to the Hawaiian name of the tree, ʻōhiʻa, upon which the fungus grows.

== Description ==
The fruit bodies of Pleurocybella ohiae are small, white, and lack a stem. The caps are 0.5–0.8 cm (0.2–0.3 in) in diameter, and have a smooth, dull surface with a silky or felt-like texture. Fruit bodies attach to the substrate by a cleft. The broad gills originate from the base of the cleft, and are distantly spaced, with two sets of interspersed lamellulae (shorter gills that do not extend completely to the cap margin). The color is white throughout, including cap, gills, and flesh.

The thin-walled spores are roughly pear-shaped to drop-shaped, smooth, hyaline (translucent), and typically measure 6.5–8 by 4.2–5.4 μm. The basidia (spore-bearing cells) deflate after ejecting their attached spores, and no sterigmata were detected. Basidioles (immature or aborted basidia) are club-shaped, have clamps, and measure 17.5–25 by 5.5–7.5 μm. The fungus lacks cystidia, and instead has basidioles on the edge of the gill. Clamp connections are present in the hyphae of all tissues.

== Habitat and distribution ==
Endemic to Hawaii, Pleurocybella ohiae is known only from a single collection, where it was found growing solitarily on the bark of Metrosideros polymorpha in the Ohia montane wet forests.
