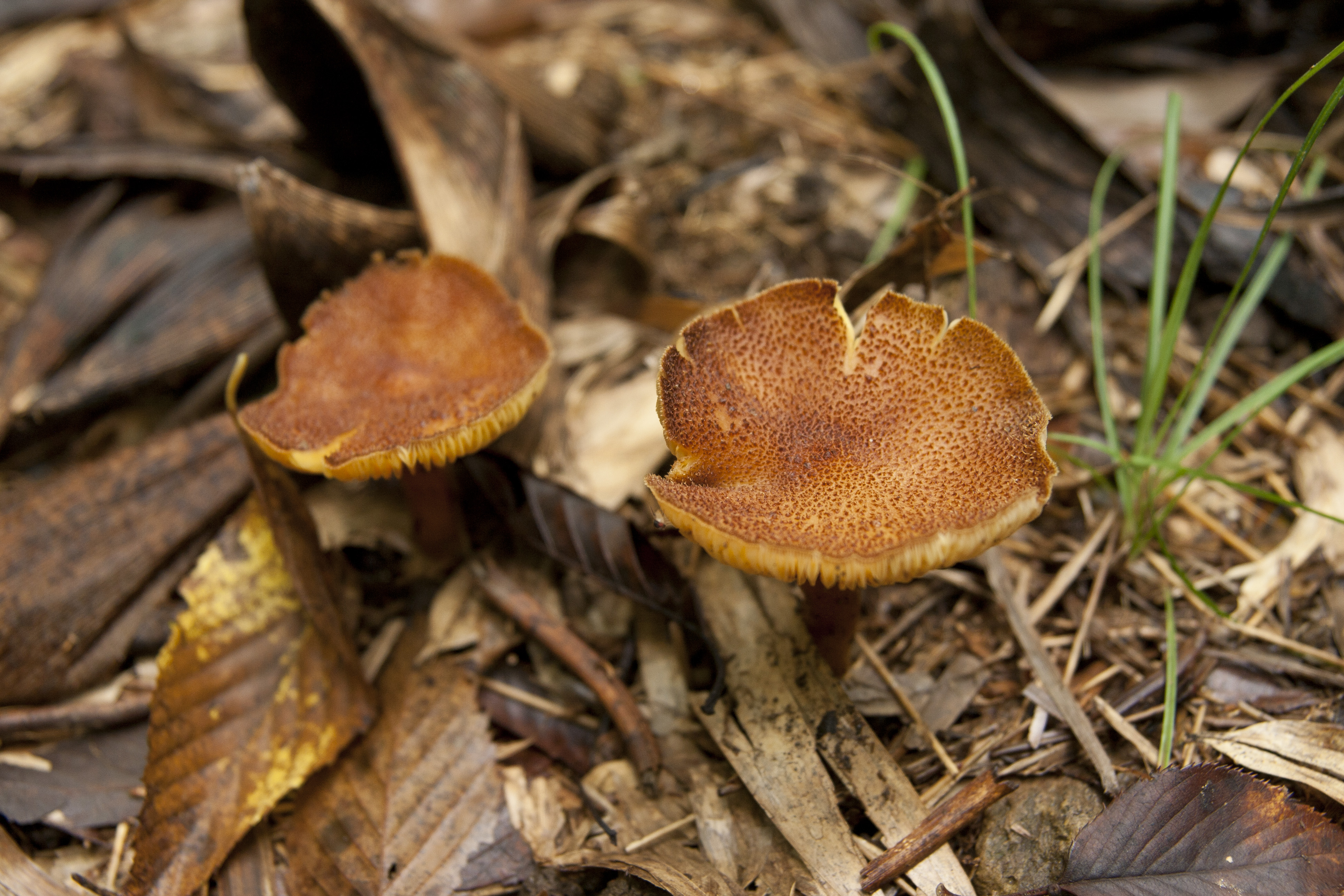

Scientific classification
- Domain: Eukaryota
- Kingdom: Fungi
- Division: Basidiomycota
- Class: Agaricomycetes
- Order: Agaricales
- Family: Phyllotopsidaceae
- Genus: Tricholomopsis
- Species: T. bambusina

Binomial name
- Tricholomopsis bambusina Hongo 1959

= Tricholomopsis bambusina =

Species of fungus

Tricholomopsis bambusina is a species of Tricholomopsis from China and Japan.

== Gallery ==
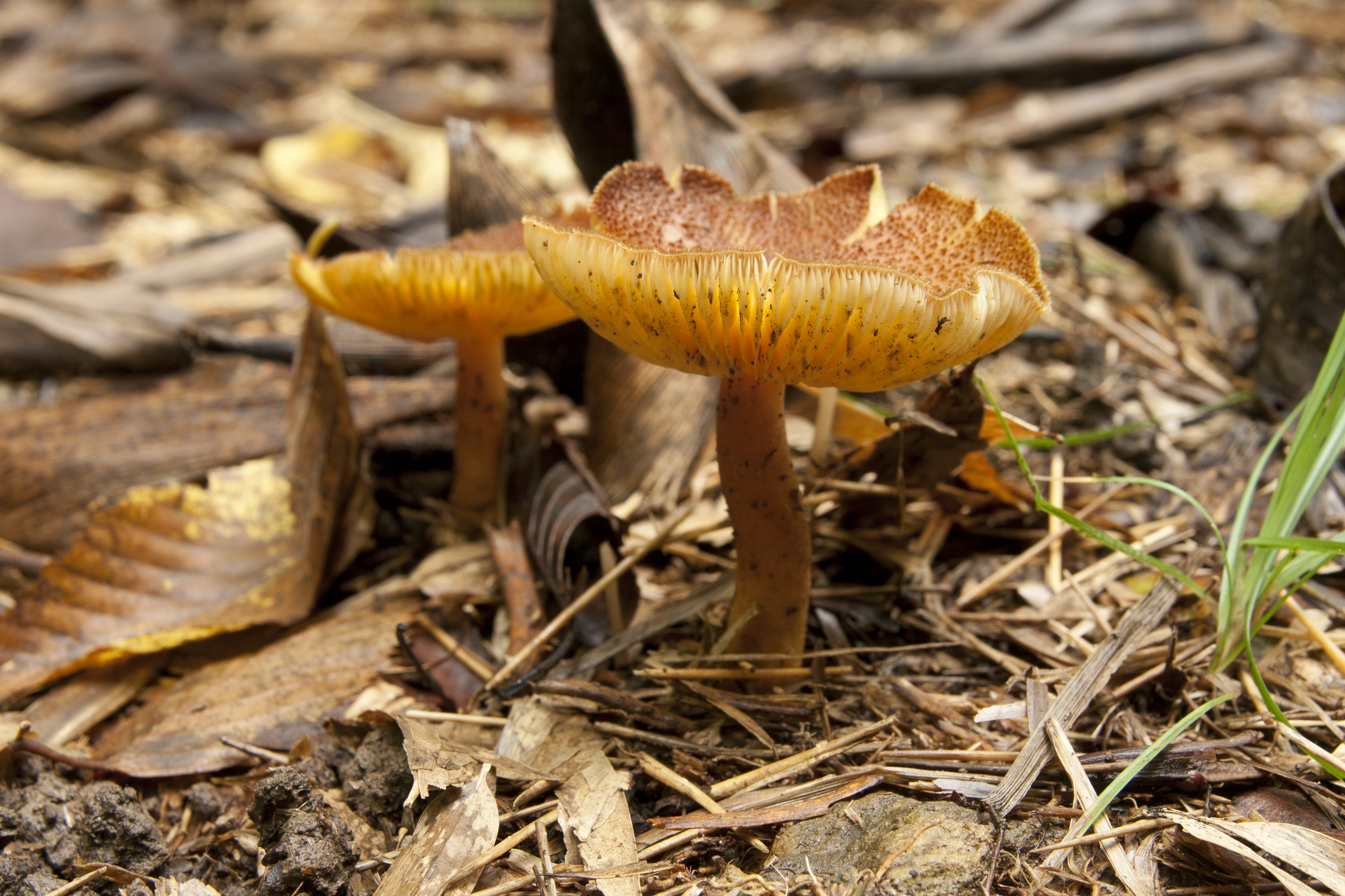

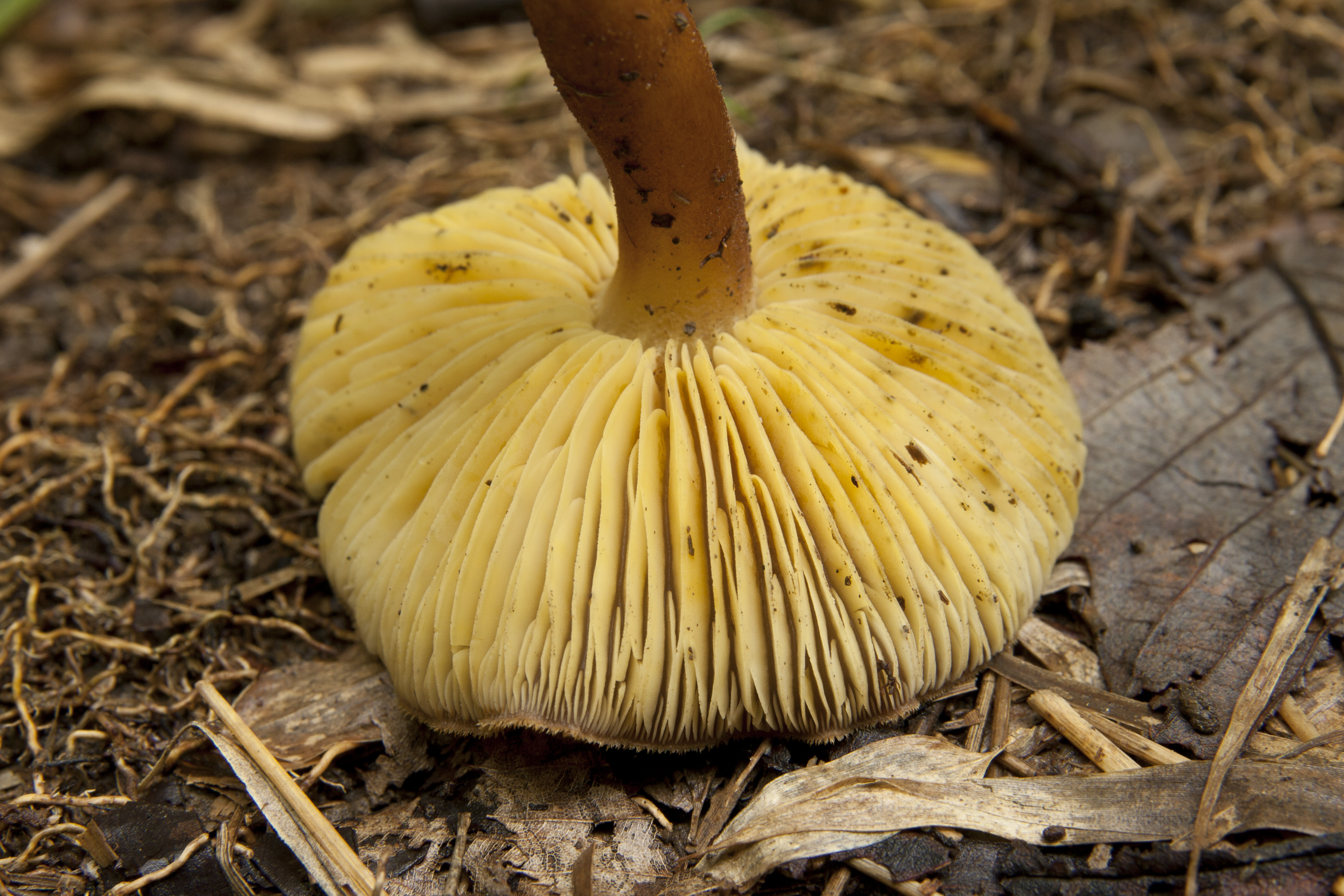

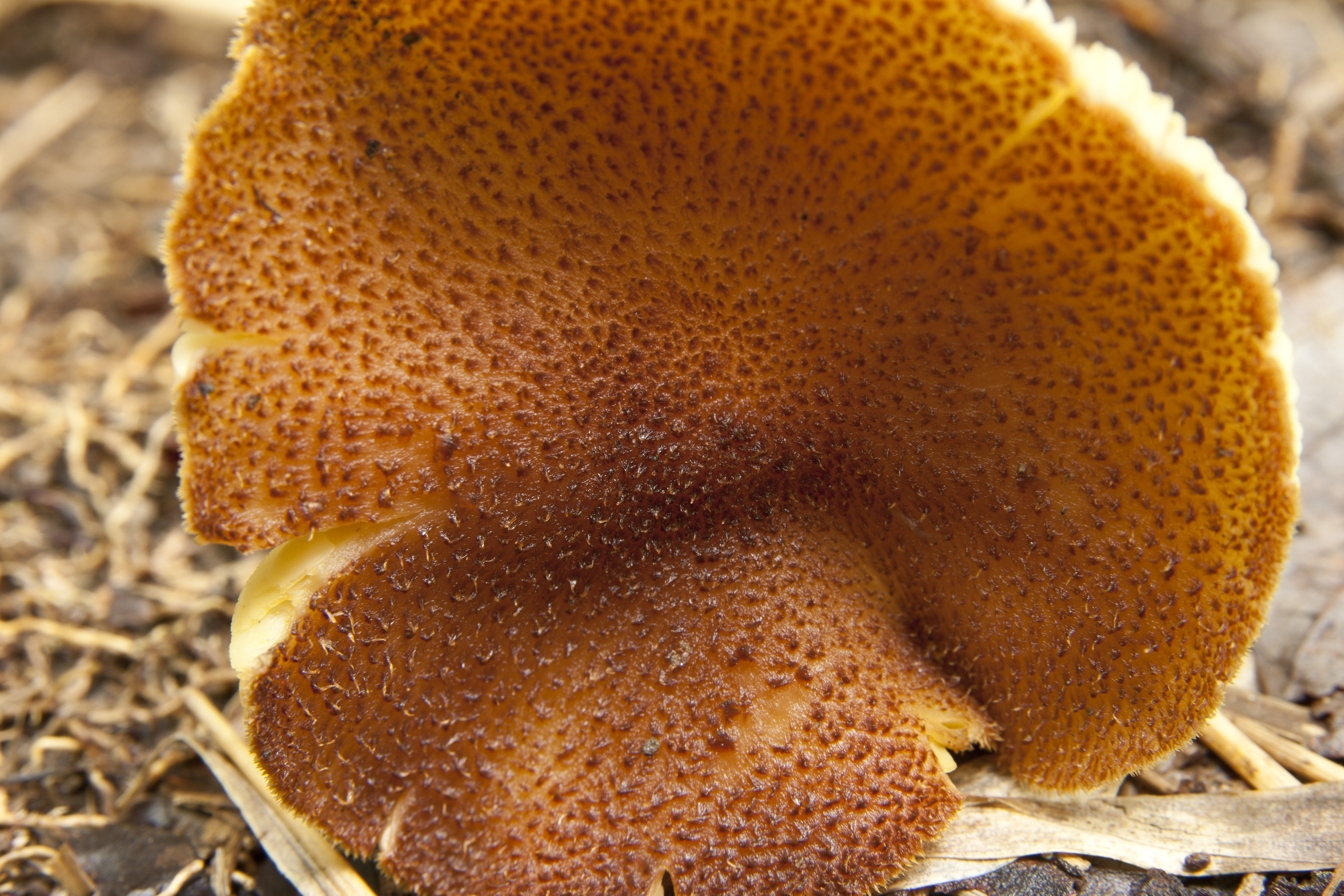

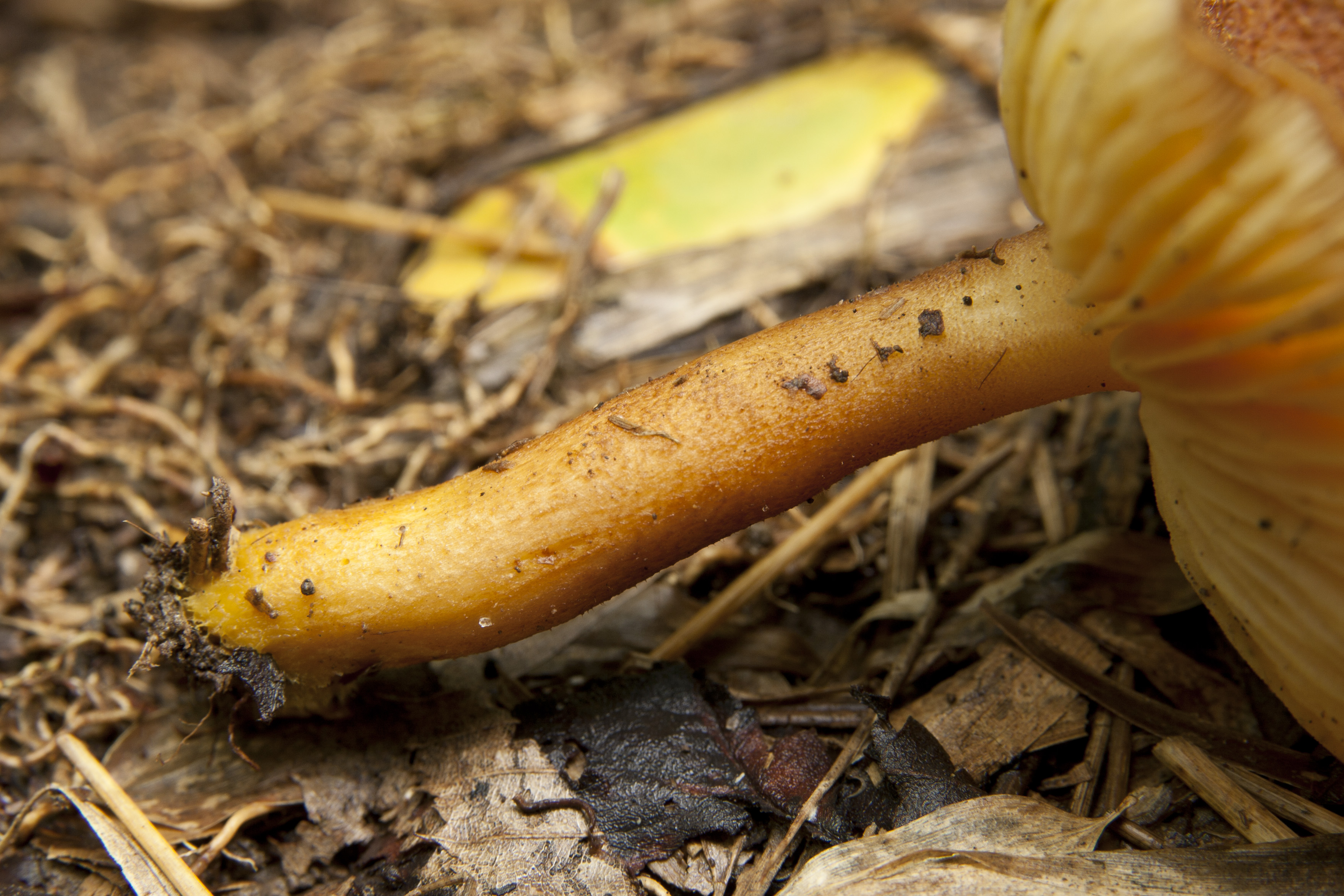
