= Phyllotopsis rhodophyllus =

Scientific classification
- Kingdom: Fungi
- Division: Basidiomycota
- Class: Agaricomycetes
- Order: Agaricales
- Family: Phyllotopsidaceae
- Genus: Phyllotopsis
- Species: P. rhodophyllus

Binomial name
- Phyllotopsis rhodophyllus (Bres.) Singer

Species of fungus

Phyllotopsis rhodophyllus is a species of fungus in the family Phyllotopsidaceae.
