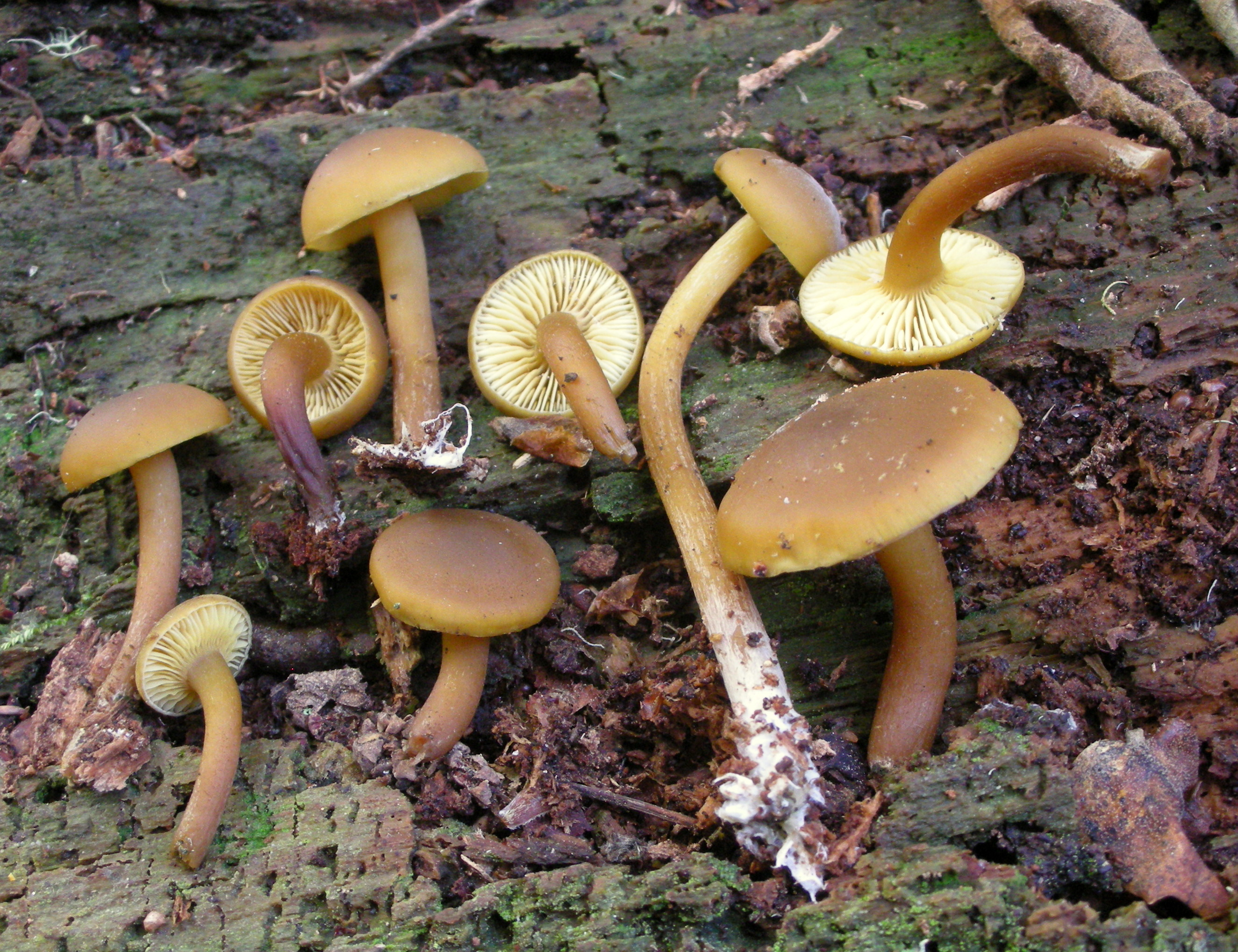

Scientific classification
- Kingdom: Fungi
- Division: Basidiomycota
- Class: Agaricomycetes
- Order: Agaricales
- Family: Callistosporiaceae
- Genus: Callistosporium
- Species: C. luteo-olivaceum

Binomial name
- Callistosporium luteo-olivaceum (Berk. & M.A.Curtis) Singer (1946)

Synonyms
- Agaricus luteo-olivaceus Berk. & M.A.Curtis (1859)

= Callistosporium luteo-olivaceum =

Species of fungus

Callistosporium luteo-olivaceum
- Mycological characteristics
- Gills on hymenium
- Cap is convex
- Hymenium is adnate or adnexed
- Stipe is bare
- Spore print is white
- Ecology is saprotrophic
- Edibility is unknown

Callistosporium luteo-olivaceum is a species of agaric fungus in the family Callistosporiaceae. It was originally described in 1859 as Agaricus luteo-olivaceus by Miles Joseph Berkeley and Moses Ashley Curtis in 1859. Rolf Singer transferred it to Callistosporium in 1946. The fungus has an extensive synonymy.

== Description ==
The brownish mushroom has caps up to 4.5 centimetres (1 3/4 in) wide. The gills are yellowish and close. The stem is 7 cm (2 3/4 in) long, fibrillose and hollow, with yellowish tomentum near the base. The spores are colorless, producing a whitish print or a yellow color in ammonia. The species can resemble Tricholomopsis aurea, T. sulfureoides, and Gymnopilus picreus.

Although rare, C. luteo-olivaceum is widely distributed in temperate and tropical areas of Europe and North America. In 2014, it was reported growing in pine forests in Western Himalaya, Pakistan. The species is inedible.
