= Phyllotopsis salmonea =

Scientific classification
- Domain: Eukaryota
- Kingdom: Fungi
- Division: Basidiomycota
- Class: Agaricomycetes
- Order: Agaricales
- Family: Phyllotopsidaceae
- Genus: Phyllotopsis
- Species: P. salmonea

Binomial name
- Phyllotopsis salmonea (Kalchbr. & MacOwan) D.A. Reid (1975)

Species of fungus

Phyllotopsis salmonea is a species of fungus in the family Phyllotopsidaceae.

== Habitat and distribution ==
Phyllotopsis salmonea is found in South Africa and Burundi.
