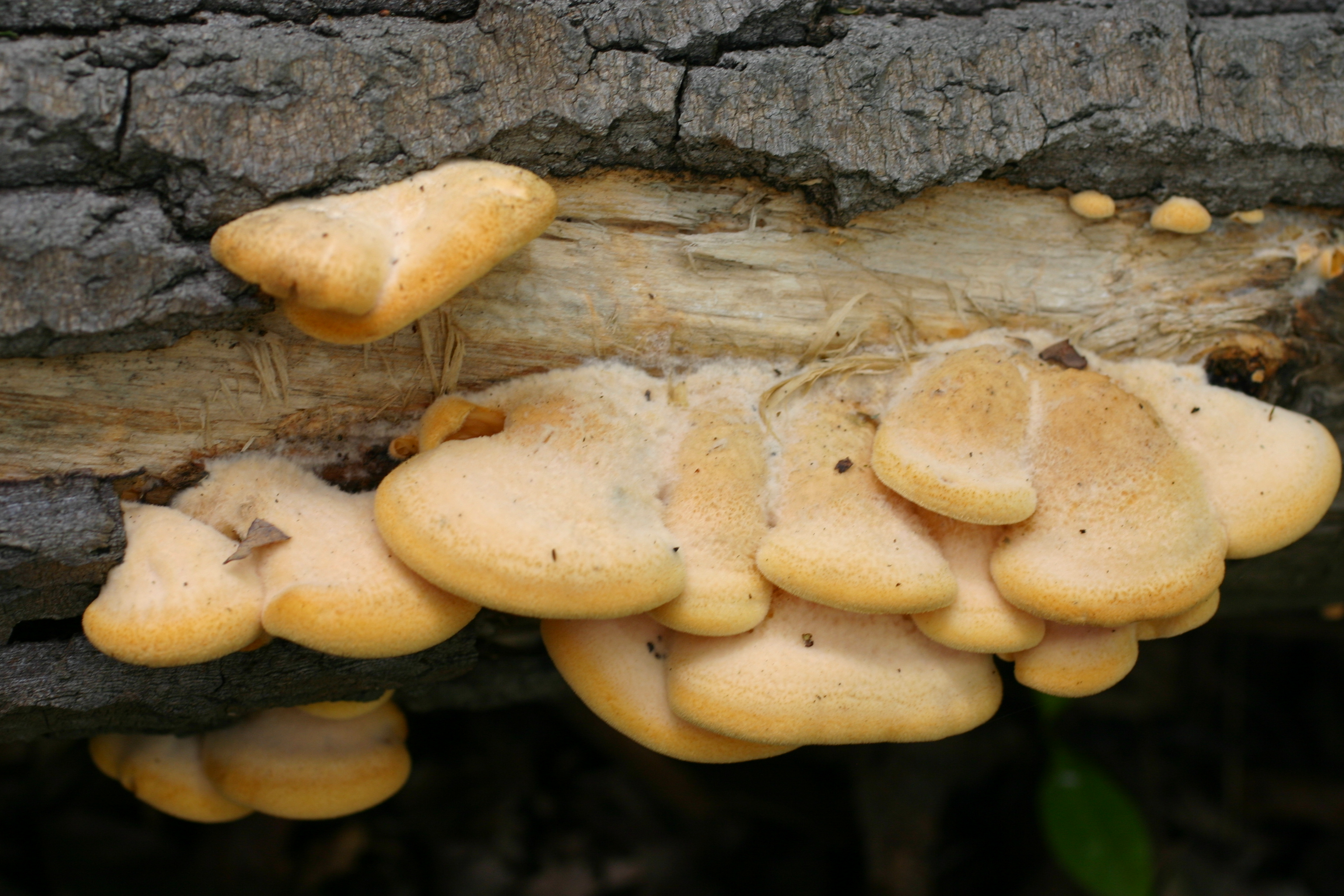
- Phyllotopsis nidulans

Scientific classification
- Kingdom: Fungi
- Division: Basidiomycota
- Class: Agaricomycetes
- Order: Agaricales
- Family: Phyllotopsidaceae
- Genus: Phyllotopsis
- Species: P. nidulans

Binomial name
- Phyllotopsis nidulans (Pers.) Singer (1936)

Synonyms
- Agaricus nidulans Pers. (1798); Dendrosarcus mollis Paulet (1793); Panus foetens Fr. (1838); Agaricus jonquilla Lév. (1855); Pleurotus nidulans (Pers.) P.Kumm. (1871); Crepidotus nidulans (Pers.) Quél. (1875); Claudopus nidulans (Pers.) Peck (1886); Crepidotus jonquilla (Lév.) Quél. (1888); Agaricus odorativus Britzelm. (1893); Dendrosarcus nidulans (Pers.) Kuntze (1898); Pocillaria foetens (Fr.) Kuntze (1898); Panus nidulans (Pers.) Pilát (1930)

= Phyllotopsis nidulans =

Species of fungus

Phyllotopsis nidulans
- Mycological characteristics
- Gills on hymenium
- Cap is convex
- Hymenium is decurrent
- Stipe is bare or lacks a stipe
- Spore print is pink to pinkish-brown
- Ecology is saprotrophic
- Edibility is unknown or inedible

Phyllotopsis nidulans, commonly known as the mock oyster or the orange oyster, is a species of fungus in the family Phyllotopsidaceae.

The fungus fruit body consists of a fan-shaped, light orange fuzzy cap up to 10 cm (4 in) wide that grows singly or in overlapping clusters. On the cap underside are crowded orange gills. Mock oyster mushrooms have an unpleasant odor and are regarded as inedible.

It is widely dispersed in temperate zones of the Northern Hemisphere, where it grows on decaying wood.

== Taxonomy ==
The mock oyster was first described scientifically in 1798 by Christian Hendrik Persoon as Agaricus nidulans. The specific epithet nidulans means "partly encased or lying in a cavity". It is commonly known as "nestcap". It is the type species of the genus Phyllotopsis.

== Description ==
The caps are 2–10 centimetres (3/4–4 in) wide. The stems are either very short or nonexistent. The flesh has a thiol-like odor similar to rotten cabbage or rotten eggs.

The spore print is pink to tannish. The smooth, sausage-shaped to cylindrical basidiospores measure 5–7 μm long by 2–3 μm wide. Clamp connections are present in the hyphae.

=== Chemistry ===
The predominant pigments in the fruit bodies include beta-carotene (58%), alpha-carotene (29%), echinenone (8%), and astaxanthin (4%). P. nidulans also produces a unique amino acid, 3-(3-carboxyfuran-4-yl) l-alanine.

=== Similar species ===
Phyllotopsis subnidulans, found in the eastern United States, is similar in appearance. It can be distinguished by a deeper orange color, thinner gills with wider inter-gill spacing, and curved to sausage-shaped spores. Other similar species include Lentinellus ursinusus, Crepidotus mollis, Panus rudis, Panus conchatus, and Pleurotus ostreatus.

== Habitat and distribution ==
Fruit bodies grow singly or in overlapping clusters on dead wood. Phyllotopsis nidulans is widely distributed in temperate regions of the Northern Hemisphere. Its range extends north to Alaska, and includes Costa Rica, where it has been recorded in the Talamanca mountains and on the Poas Volcano. In Asia, it has been recorded in Korea.

== Edibility ==
Although not known to be poisonous, the disagreeable odor would deter most from eating the mushrooms.
