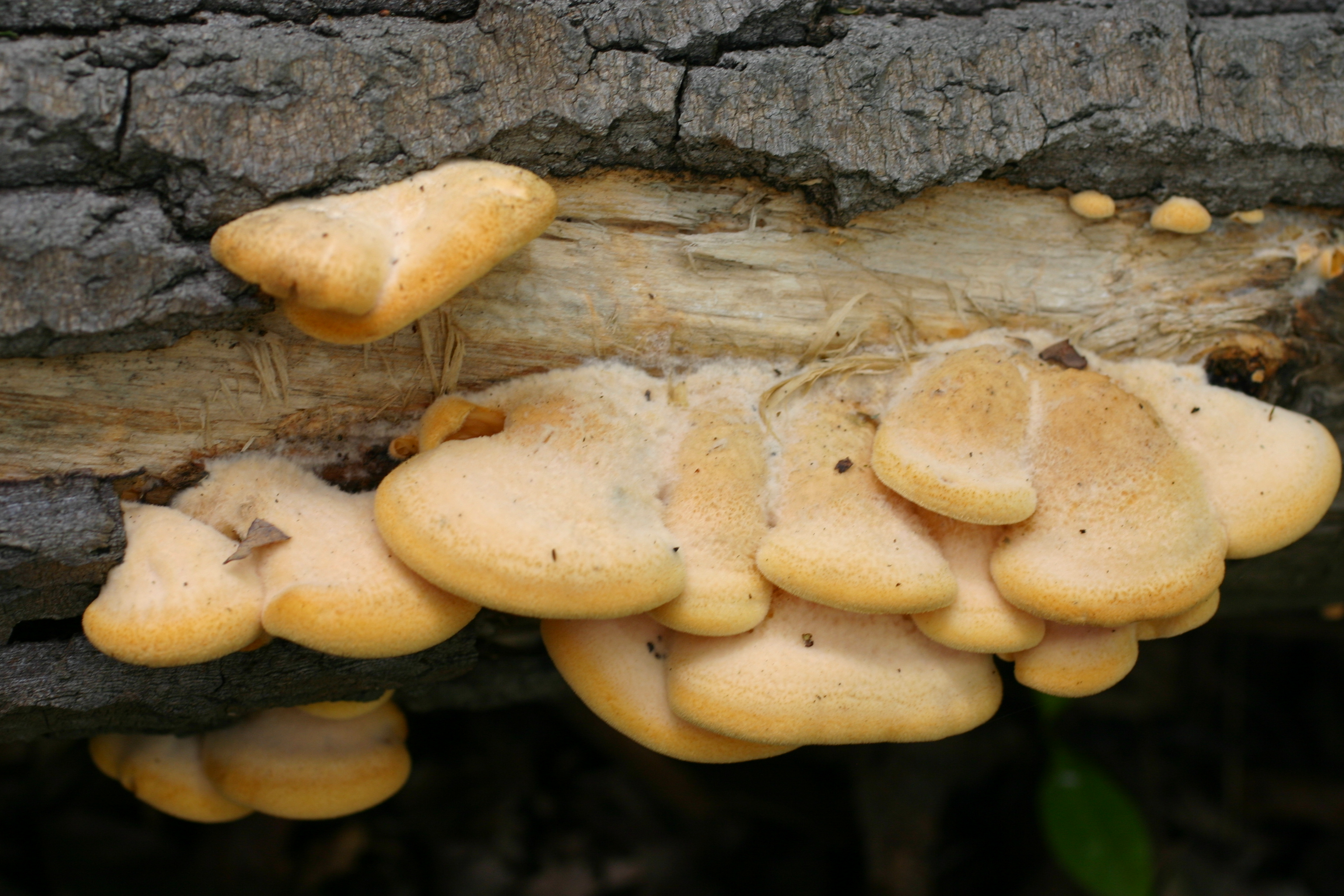
- Phyllotopsis nidulans

Scientific classification
- Domain: Eukaryota
- Kingdom: Fungi
- Division: Basidiomycota
- Class: Agaricomycetes
- Order: Agaricales
- Family: Phyllotopsidaceae
- Genus: Phyllotopsis; E.-J.Gilbert & Donk ex Singer

Type species
- Phyllotopsis nidulans (Pers.) Singer

Species
- P. ealaensis P. nidulans P. rhodophyllus P. salmonea P. subnidulans

= Phyllotopsis =

Genus of fungi

Phyllotopsis is a genus of fungi in the family Phyllotopsidaceae. The widespread genus contain five species that occur predominantly in temperate regions.

== Species ==
- Phyllotopsis ealaensis
- Phyllotopsis nidulans
- Phyllotopsis rhodophyllus
- Phyllotopsis salmonea
- Phyllotopsis subnidulans
