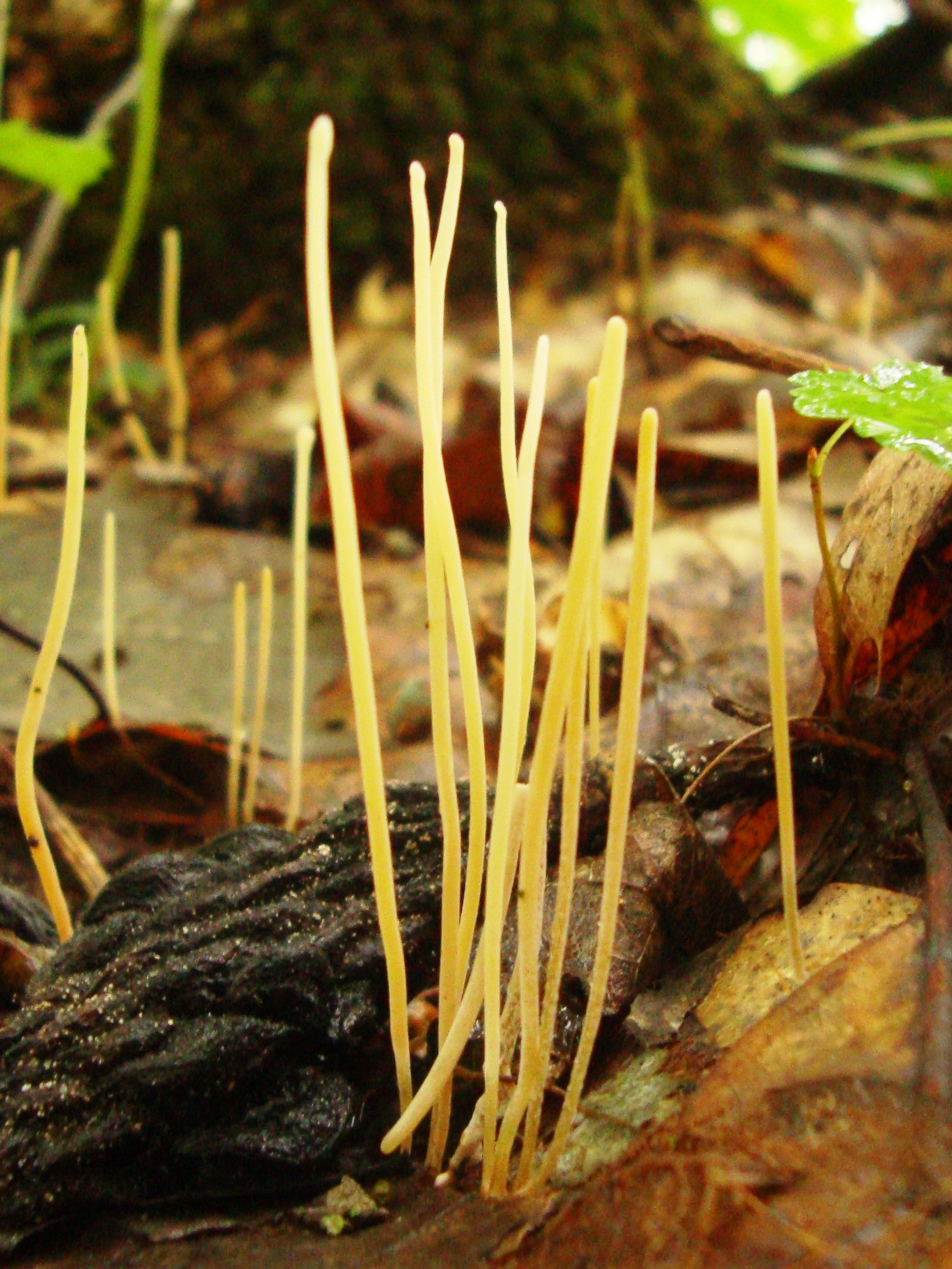
- Macrotyphula juncea

Scientific classification
- Kingdom: Fungi
- Division: Basidiomycota
- Class: Agaricomycetes
- Order: Agaricales
- Family: Phyllotopsidaceae
- Genus: Macrotyphula; R.H.Petersen (1972)

Type species
- Macrotyphula fistulosa (Holmsk.) R.H.Petersen (1972)

Species
- M. contorta M. cordispora M. defibulata M. fistulosa M. juncea M. megasperma M. phacorrhiza M. rigida M. rhizomorpha M. tremula

Synonyms
- Sclerotium Tode (1790)

= Macrotyphula =

Genus of fungi

Macrotyphula is a genus of clavarioid fungi in the family Phyllotopsidaceae. Basidiocarps (fruit bodies) are simple, narrowly club-shaped to filiform, sometimes arising from a sclerotium. They typically grow on dead wood or leaf litter, often in swarms.

== Taxonomy ==
The genus was described in 1972 by American mycologist Ronald H. Petersen for M. fistulosa which he considered morphologically distinct from species in the genus Clavariadelphus where it had previously been referred. Additional species have subsequently been referred to Macrotyphula. Molecular research, based on cladistic analysis of DNA sequences, indicates that the genus is monophyletic and forms a natural group.

=== The genus Sclerotium ===
Sclerotium was introduced by the German mycologist and theologian Heinrich Julius Tode in 1790 to accommodate fungal sclerotia (propagules composed of thick-walled hyphae). Over 400 species were subsequently added to this form genus, comprising sclerotia or sclerotia-like entities from a wide range of fungi within the phyla Ascomycota and Basidiomycota.

With a move towards a more natural classification of fungi, the genus Sclerotium was restricted to sclerotial anamorphs of Macrotyphula, since the type species, Sclerotium complanatum, is the anamorph of Macrotyphula phacorrhiza. Other species have been transferred elsewhere. Following changes to the International Code of Nomenclature for algae, fungi, and plants, the practice of giving different names to teleomorph and anamorph forms of the same fungus was discontinued, meaning that Macrotyphula should become a synonym of the earlier name Sclerotium. A formal proposal to conserve the genus Macrotyphula against Sclerotium is, however, in preparation.

== See also ==
- List of Agaricales genera
