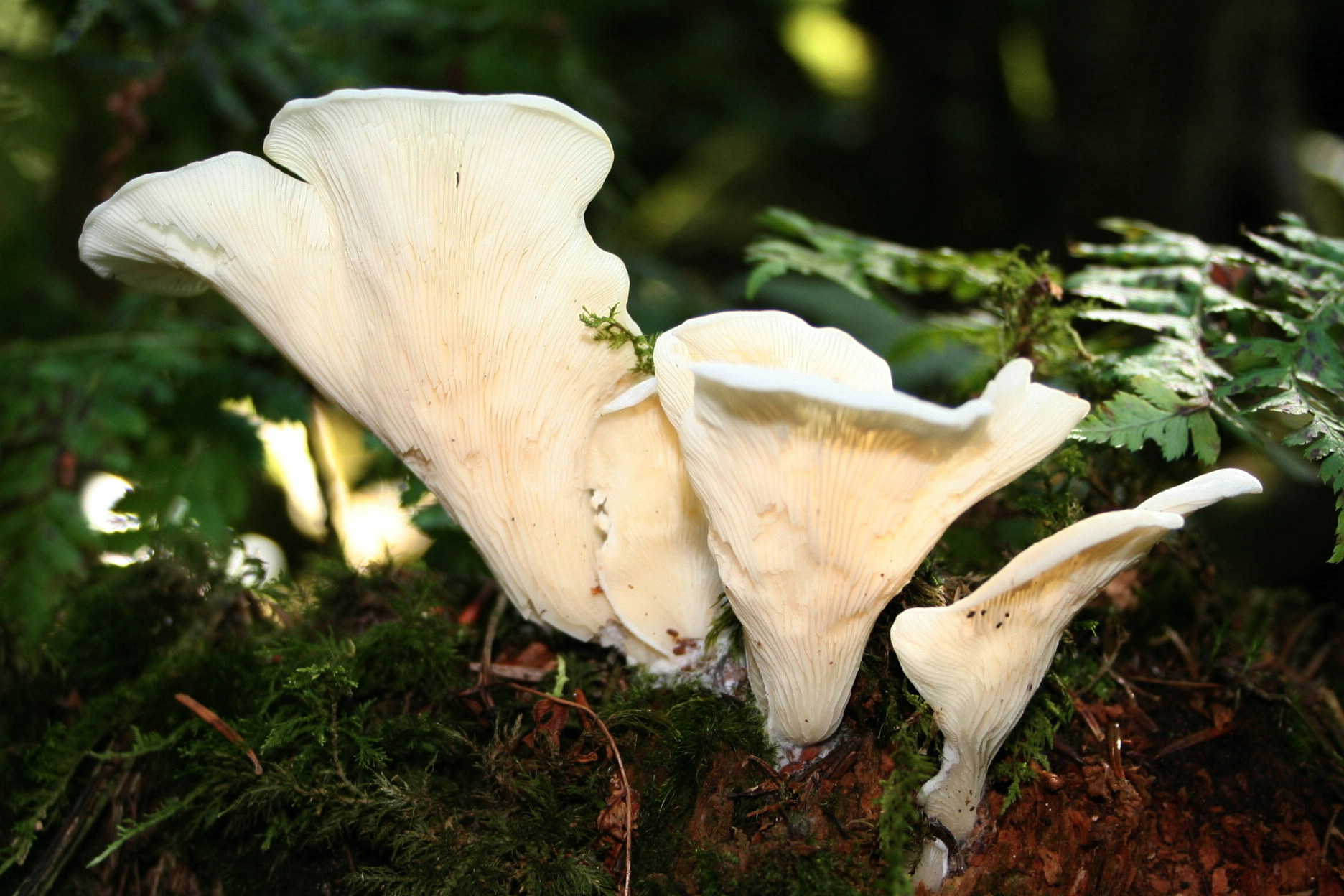
- Pleurocybella porrigens

Scientific classification
- Domain: Eukaryota
- Kingdom: Fungi
- Division: Basidiomycota
- Class: Agaricomycetes
- Order: Agaricales
- Family: Phyllotopsidaceae
- Genus: Pleurocybella; Singer (1947)

Type species
- Pleurocybella porrigens (Pers.) Singer (1947)

Species
- Pleurocybella ohiae Pleurocybella porrigens

= Pleurocybella =

Genus of fungi

Pleurocybella is a genus of fungi in the family Phyllotopsidaceae.
