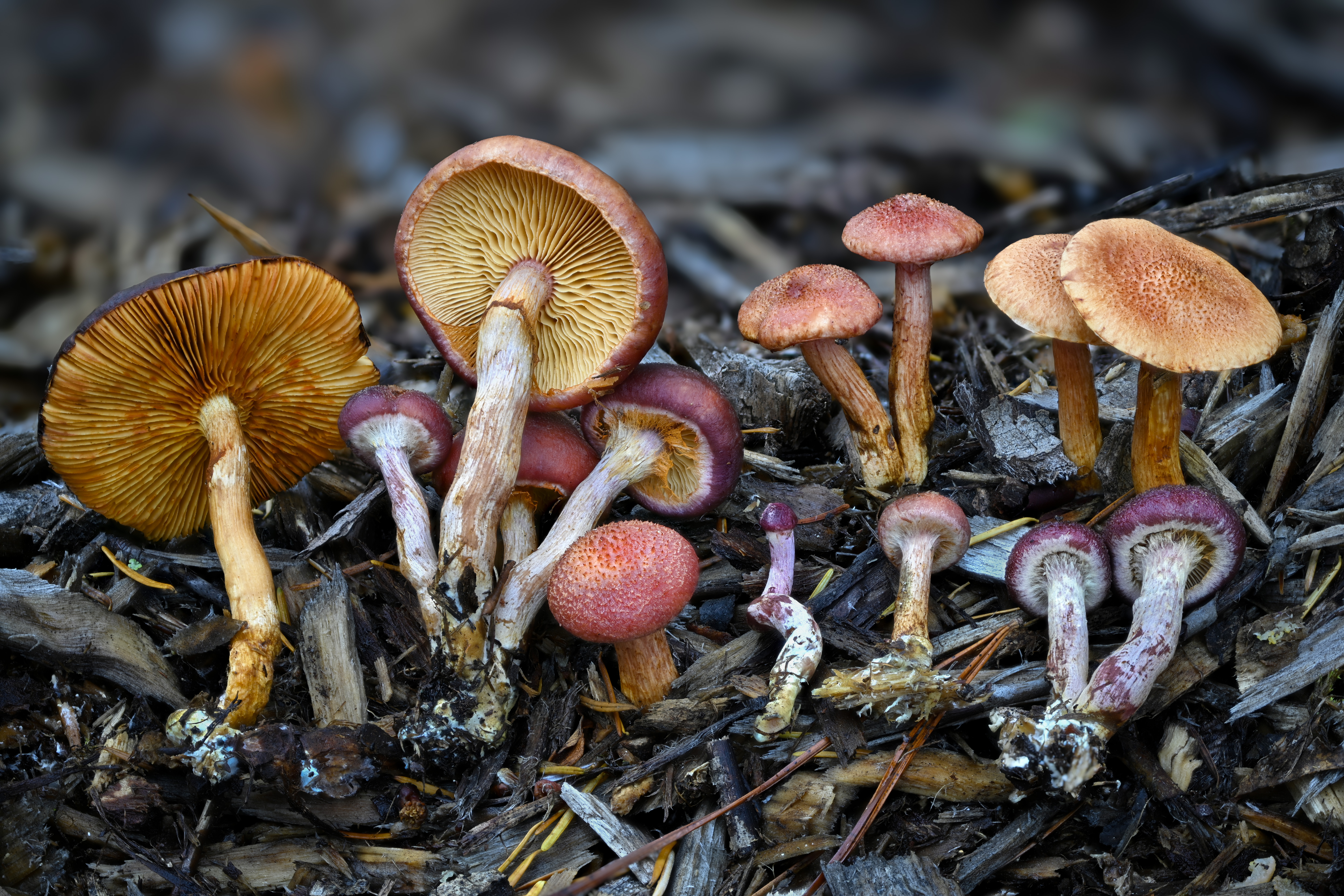

Scientific classification
- Kingdom: Fungi
- Division: Basidiomycota
- Class: Agaricomycetes
- Order: Agaricales
- Family: Hymenogastraceae
- Genus: Gymnopilus
- Species: G. luteofolius

Binomial name
- Gymnopilus luteofolius (Peck) Singer (1951)

Synonyms
- Agaricus luteofolius Peck (1875); Pholiota luteofolius (Peck) Sacc. (1887)

= Gymnopilus luteofolius =

Gymnopilus luteofolius Mycological characteristics
- Gills on hymenium
- Cap is convex
- Hymenium is adnate
- Stipe has a ring
- Spore print is reddish-brown
- Ecology is saprotrophic
- Edibility is unknown

Gymnopilus luteofolius, commonly known as the purple gym or yellow-gilled gymnopilus, is a large and widely distributed mushroom. It has a rusty orange spore print and a bitter taste. It can be found throughout North America.

== Taxonomy ==
Gymnopilus luteofolius was first described as Agaricus luteofolius by Charles Horton Peck in 1875. It was renamed Pholiota luteofolius by Pier Andrea Saccardo in 1887, and was given its current name by mycologist Rolf Singer in 1951.

== Description ==
The fruit bodies have reddish to purplish to yellow caps 2 to 11 centimetres (3/4 to 4 1/4 in) in diameter, which can stain bluish-green. This cap surface is covered with fasciculate scales that start out purplish, soon fade to brick red, and finally fades to yellow as the mushroom matures. The context is reddish to light lavender, fading to yellowish as the mushroom matures. The gills have adnate attachment and start off yellow, turning rusty brown as the spores mature. The stipe is the same color as the cap, often dusted with rusty-brown spores, fibrillose, measuring 3–9 by 3–10 mm thick, equal to enlarged near the base. The stipe often has greenish stains near the base. The taste is bitter.

The spores are bright rusty brown in deposit, measuring 6–8.5 x 4–4.5 μm, ellipsoid to subellipsoid, inequilateral, roughened and dextrinoid, with no germ pore. The basidia measure 24–28 x 6–7 μm and are 4-spored. The basidioles are often brown. The pleurocystidia (cystidia on the gill face) measures 30–38 x 5–10 μm, hyaline, fusoid to subventricose. The cystidia on the gill edge (cheilocystidia) measures 23–28 x 4–7 μm, ventricose to flash shaped, often capitate. The lamellar flesh (trama) is made up of parallel hyphae 5–18 μm across, frequently septate, with yellowish pigment that is dissolved by potassium hydroxide. The pileus trama is interwoven, and the pileus cuticle has brown tufts of brown incrusted hyphae. The pileocystidia measure 44–53 μm, and are club-shaped, cylindrical or ventricose terminal elements on the hyphae that forms the scales on the cap. Cystidia on the stipe (caulocystidia) are 20–63 x 3–15 μm, club shaped, ventricose or flask shaped. The gill trama and pileus trama are pale yellowish-brown in KOH and reddish brown in Melzer's reagent. Clamp connections are present.

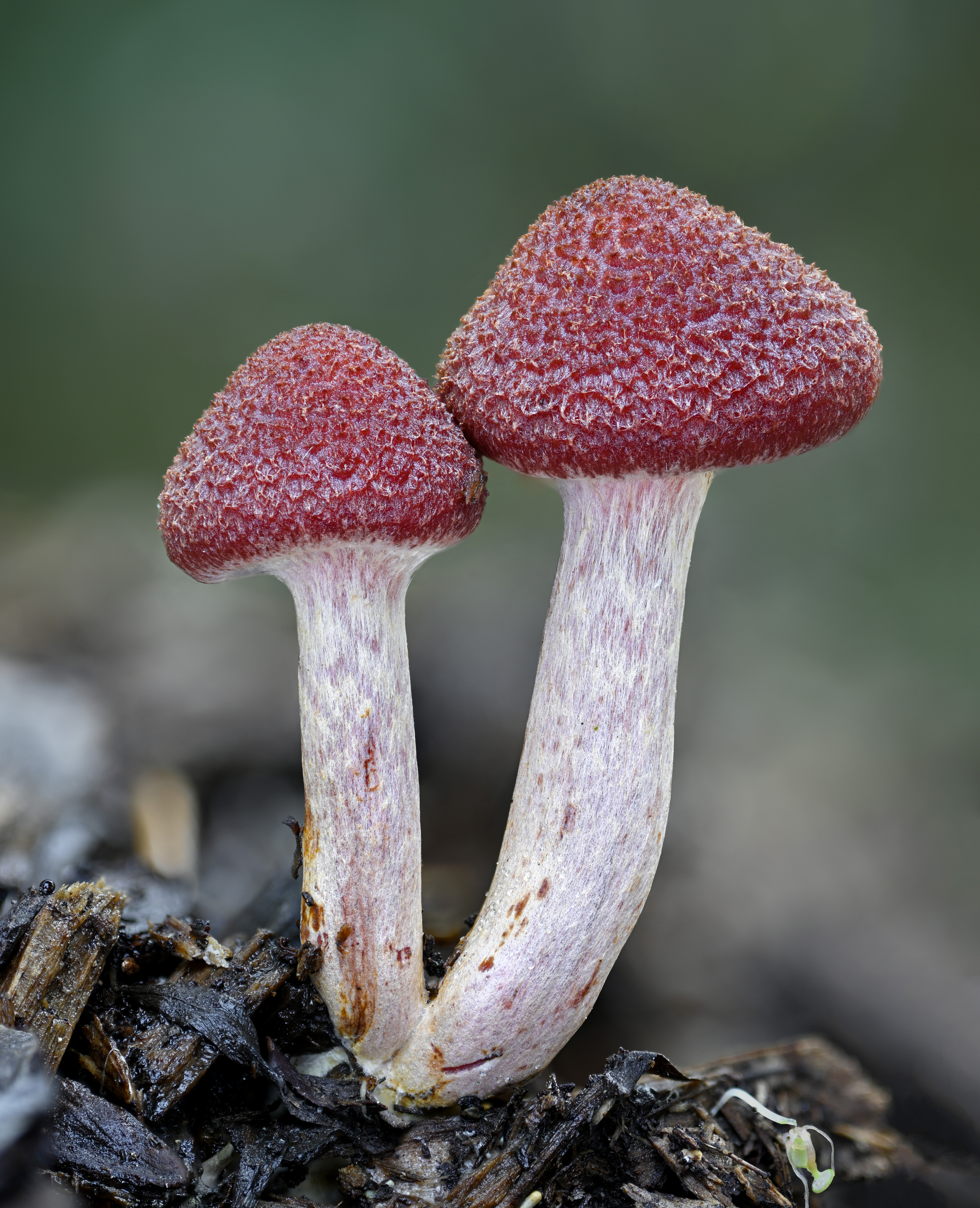
In youth

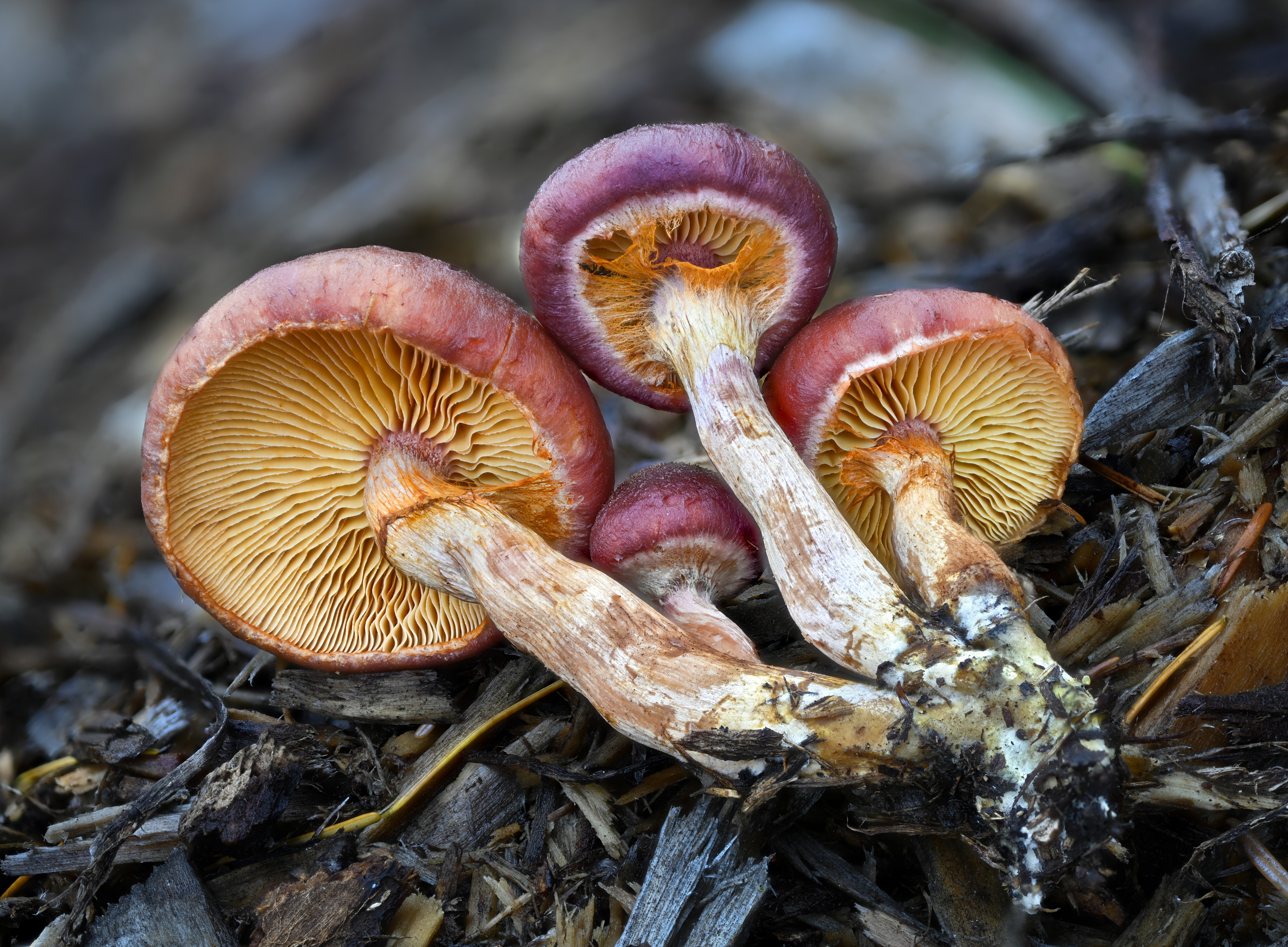
Undersides

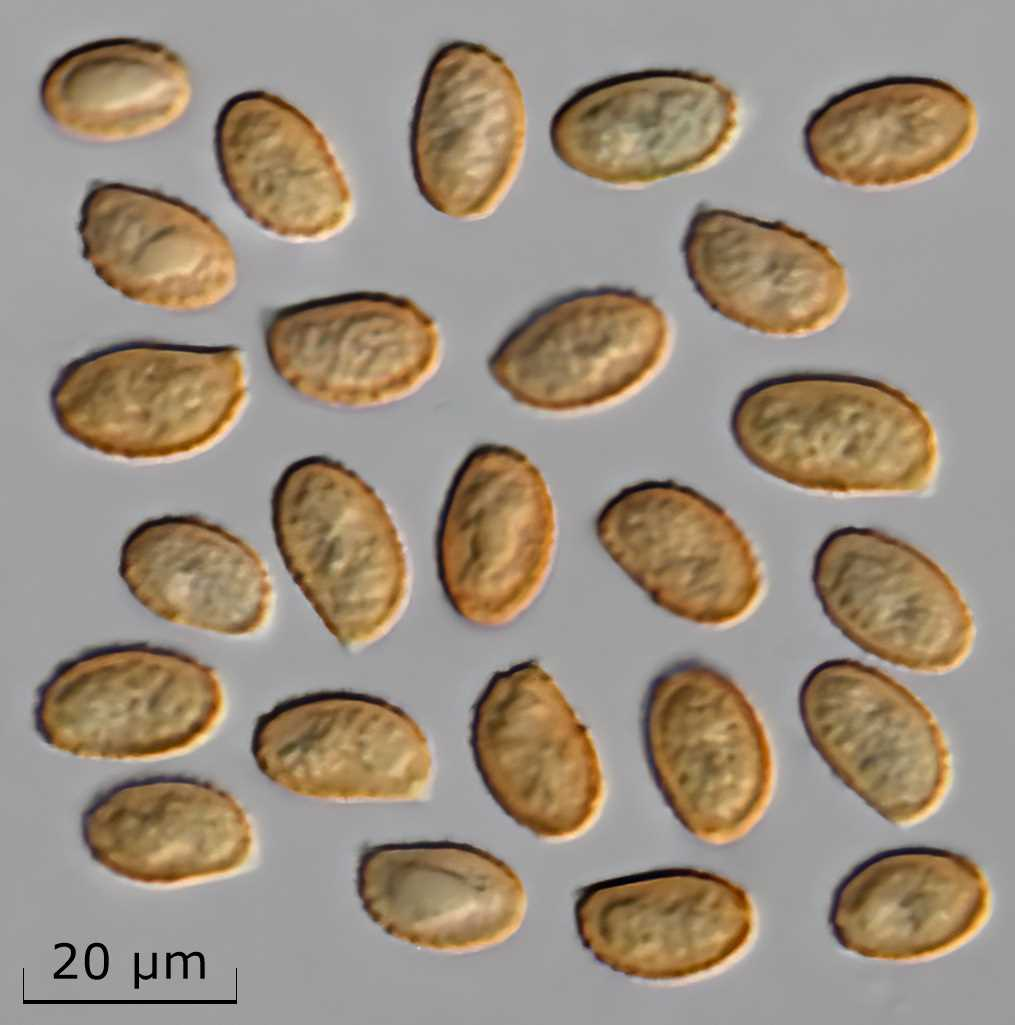
Spores

=== Similar species ===
It resembles Tricholomopsis rutilans, which has a white spore print.

== Habitat and distribution ==
It grows in dense clusters on dead hardwoods and conifers in North America, where it is common. It appears generally from June to October, or September to March on the West Coast.

== Potential uses ==
Its edibility is unknown. Mycologist David Arora notes that the related G. aeruginosus is psychoactive.

== See also ==
- List of Gymnopilus species
