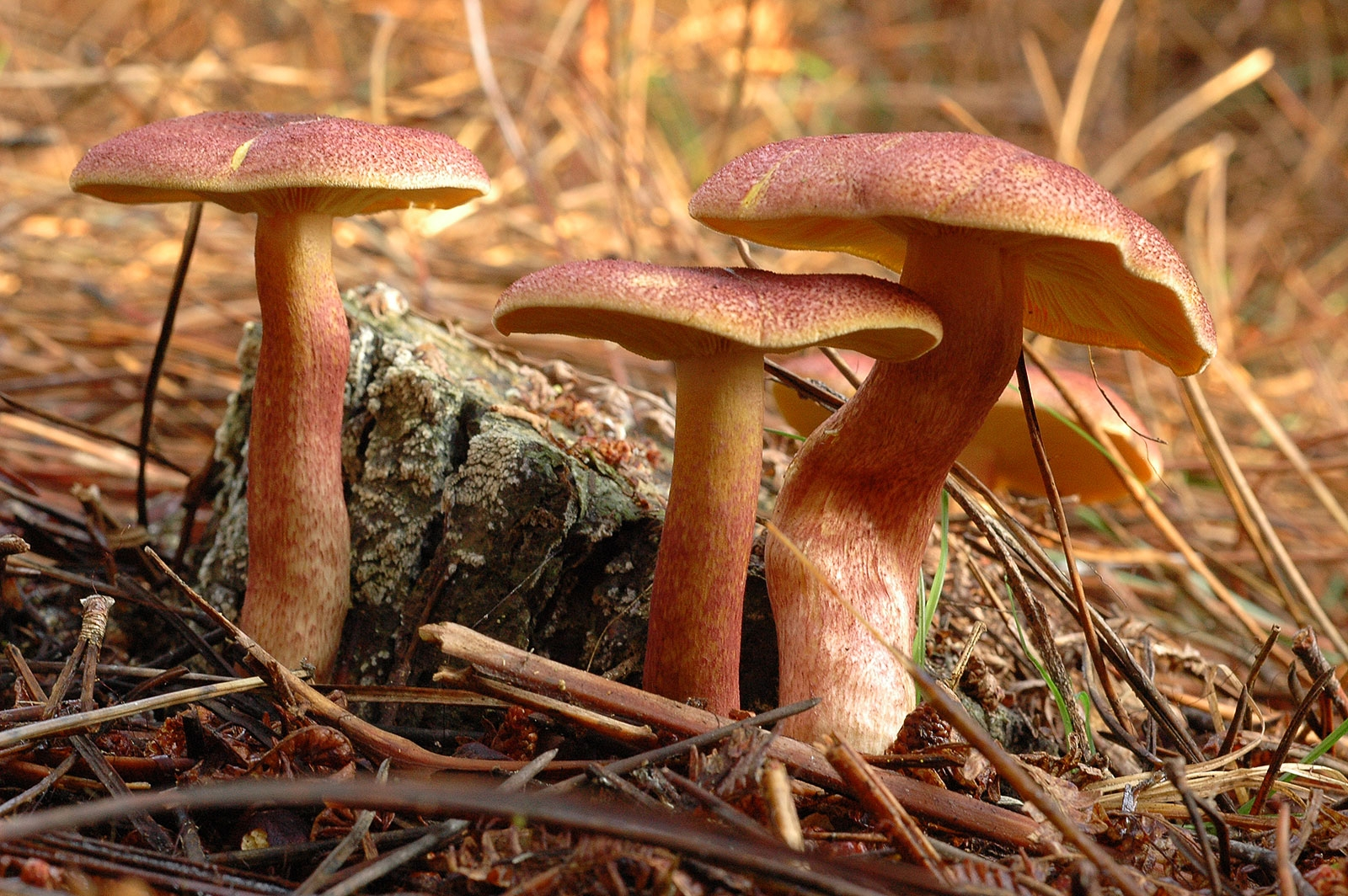
- Tricholomopsis rutilans Pine woods, Galicia - Alberto Vázquez

Scientific classification
- Domain: Eukaryota
- Kingdom: Fungi
- Division: Basidiomycota
- Class: Agaricomycetes
- Order: Agaricales
- Family: Phyllotopsidaceae
- Genus: Tricholomopsis; Singer

Type species
- Tricholomopsis rutilans (Schaeff.) Singer

= Tricholomopsis =

Genus of fungi

Tricholomopsis is a genus of fungi in the family Phyllotopsidaceae. Its best known member and type species is Tricholomopsis rutilans. The name means appearing like Tricholoma. The genus has a widespread distribution, and contains about 30 species. Tricholomopsis was described in 1939 by German mycologist Rolf Singer.

== List of species ==
- Tricholomopsis decora (Europe, North America)
- Tricholomopsis bambusina (Japan)
- Tricholomopsis flammula
- Tricholomopsis flavissima (North America)
- Tricholomopsis formosa (North America)
- Tricholomopsis humboltii (Costa Rica, Colombia)
- Tricholomopsis ornata
- Tricholomopsis ornaticeps (New Zealand)
- Tricholomopsis osiliensis (Estonia)
- Tricholomopsis rutilans - Plums and Custard (Europe, North America, Australia)
- Tricholomopsis scabra (New Zealand)
- Tricholomopsis sulfureoides (North America)
- Tricholomopsis totilivida (North America, Costa Rica)

== See also ==
- List of Tricholomataceae genera
