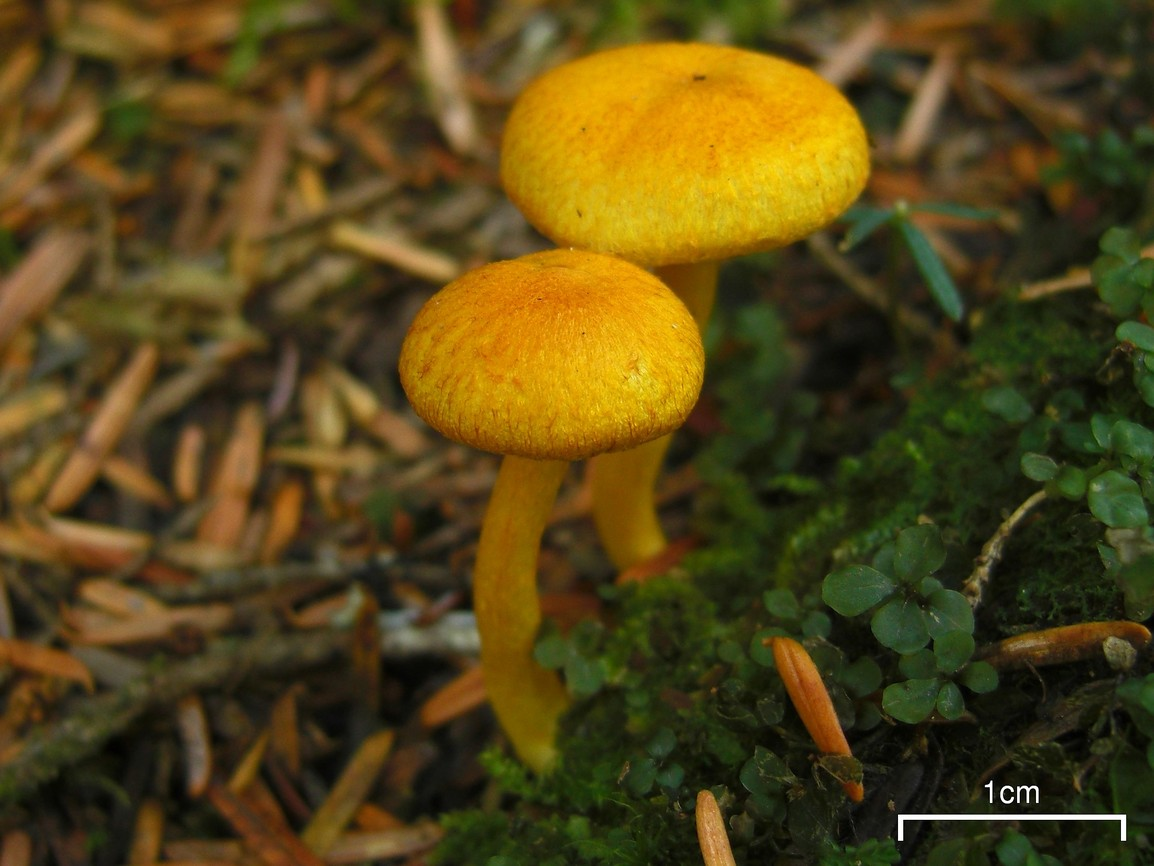

Scientific classification
- Domain: Eukaryota
- Kingdom: Fungi
- Division: Basidiomycota
- Class: Agaricomycetes
- Order: Agaricales
- Family: Phyllotopsidaceae
- Genus: Tricholomopsis
- Species: T. sulfureoides

Binomial name
- Tricholomopsis sulfureoides (Peck) H.E.Bigelow (1969)

Synonyms
- Clitocybe sulphurea Peck (1888)

= Tricholomopsis sulfureoides =

Species of fungus

Tricholomopsis sulfureoides is a species of gilled mushroom found in the United States. Its fruit bodies have pale yellow caps with differently colored zones of paler yellow and light yellow streaks. Its gills are broad and yellow, with an adnexed attachment to the yellow stipe. Young mushrooms have a thin partial veil. The mushroom is found growing singly or in groups on rotting conifer logs. The fungus was originally described as Clitocybe sulphurea by Charles Horton Peck in 1888; Rolf Singer transferred it to Tricholomopsis in 1969.
