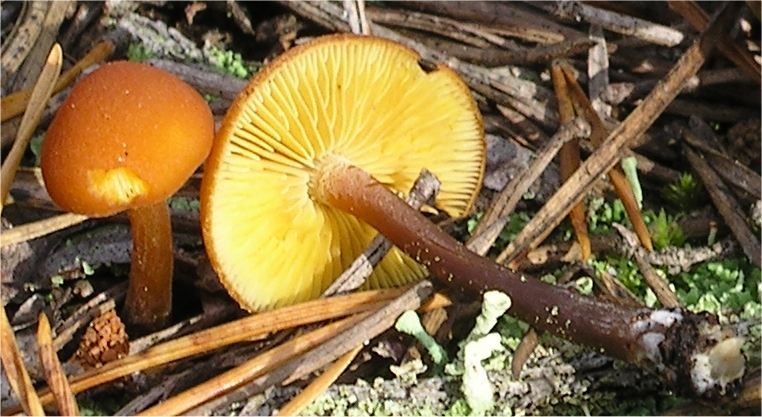

Scientific classification
- Kingdom: Fungi
- Division: Basidiomycota
- Class: Agaricomycetes
- Order: Agaricales
- Family: Hymenogastraceae
- Genus: Gymnopilus
- Species: G. picreus

Binomial name
- Gymnopilus picreus (Pers.) P. Karst.

= Gymnopilus picreus =

Species of fungus

Gymnopilus picreus
- Mycological characteristics
- Gills on hymenium
- Cap is convex
- Hymenium is adnexed or adnate
- Ecology is saprotrophic

Gymnopilus picreus is a species of mushroom in the family Hymenogastraceae.

== Description ==
The cap is 1 to 2 centimetres (0.4 to 0.8 in) in diameter.

== Habitat and distribution ==
Gymnopilus picreus grows on conifer wood and sometimes on hardwood. It has been found in the northern United States, Canada, and Europe; fruiting in summer and autumn.

== See also ==
- List of Gymnopilus species
