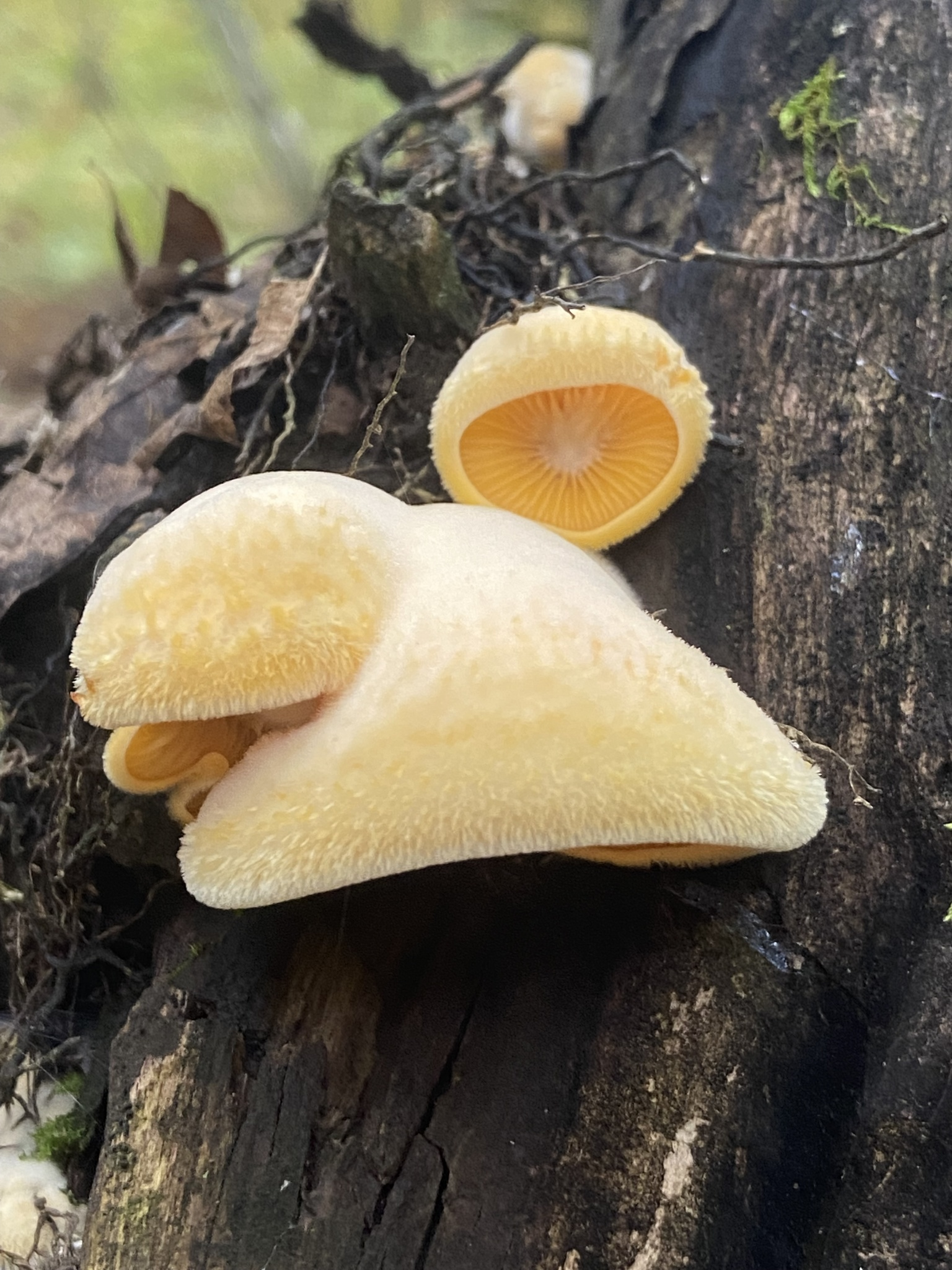
- Phyllotopsis nidulans

Scientific classification
- Kingdom: Fungi
- Division: Basidiomycota
- Class: Agaricomycetes
- Order: Agaricales
- Family: Phyllotopsidaceae; Locquin ex Olariaga, Huhtinen, Læssøe, J.H. Petersen & K. Hansen (2020)

Type genus
- Phyllotopsis E.-J. Gilbert & Donk ex Singer (1936)

Genera
- Conoloma; Cyphelloporia; Macrotyphula; Phyllotopsis; Pleurocybella; Rectipilus; Tricholomopsis

= Phyllotopsidaceae =

Family of fungi

The Phyllotopsidaceae are a family of fungi in the order Agaricales. Basidiocarps are either clavarioid (Macrotyphula), agaricoid (Tricholomopsis), or cyphelloid. Marcel Locquin originally established the family on the basis of shared morphological characteristics, but did not validly publish it. The name was later validated by Olariaga and the family was expanded to contain other genera as a result of molecular research, based on cladistic analysis of DNA sequences.

== See also ==
- List of Agaricales families
