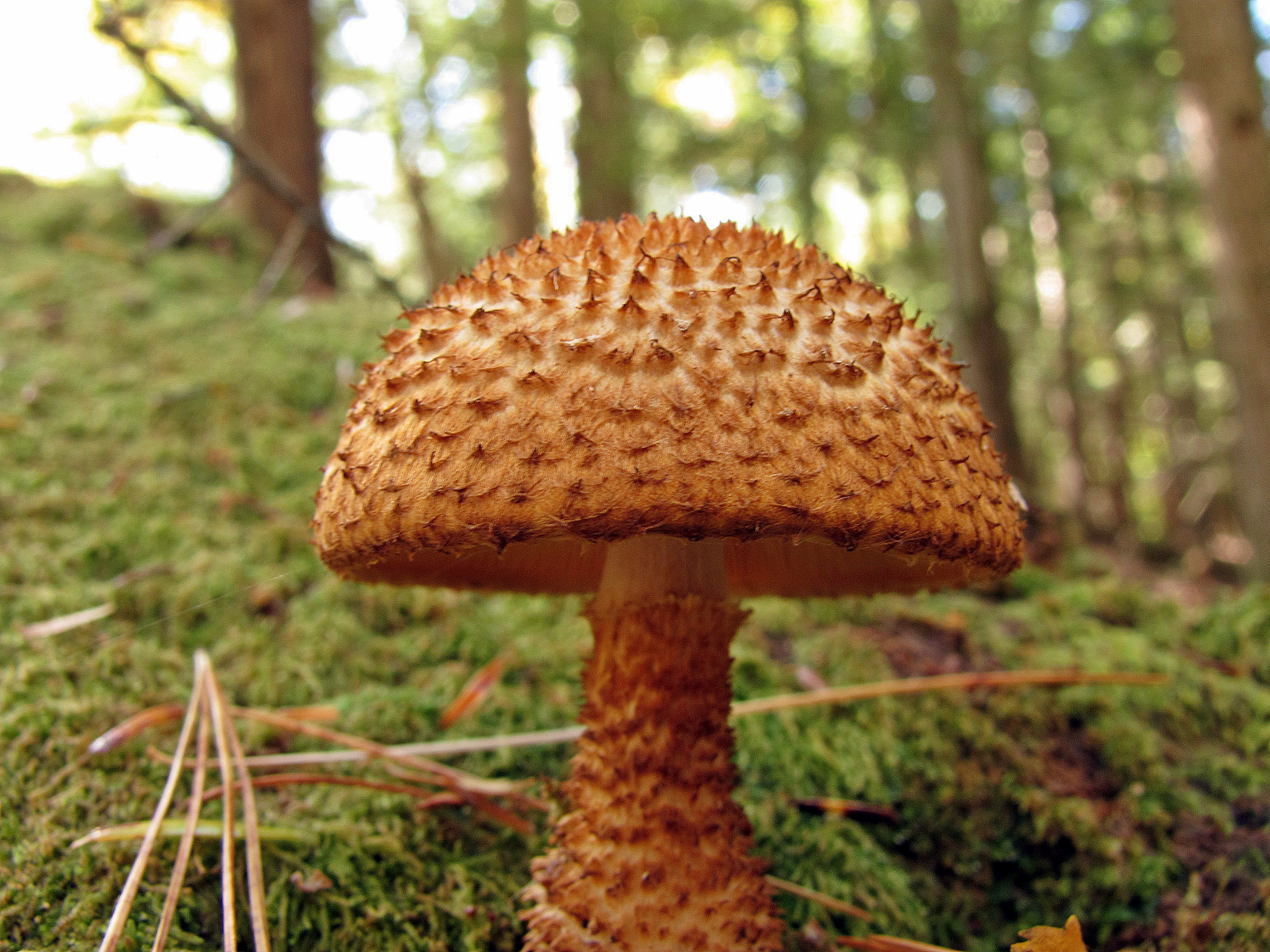

Scientific classification
- Kingdom: Fungi
- Division: Basidiomycota
- Class: Agaricomycetes
- Order: Agaricales
- Family: Squamanitaceae
- Genus: Leucopholiota
- Species: L. decorosa

Binomial name
- Leucopholiota decorosa (Peck) O.K.Mill., T.J.Volk & A.E.Bessette (1996)

Synonyms
- Agaricus decorosus Peck (1873); Tricholoma decorosum (Peck) Sacc. (1887); Tricholomopsis decorosa (Peck) Singer (1943); Armillaria decorosa (Peck) A.H.Sm. (1947); Floccularia decorosa (Peck) Bon & Courtec. (1987)

= Leucopholiota decorosa =

Species of fungus

Leucopholiota decorosa
- Mycological characteristics
- Gills on hymenium
- Cap is conical or flat
- Hymenium is adnexed
- Stipe has a ring
- Spore print is white
- Ecology is saprotrophic
- Edibility is unknown

Leucopholiota decorosa is a species of fungus in the mushroom family Squamanitaceae. It is commonly known as the decorated pholiota. It was first described by American mycologist Charles Horton Peck as Agaricus decorosus in 1873, and the species has been transferred to several genera in its history, including Tricholoma, Tricholomopsis, Armillaria, and Floccularia. Three American mycologists considered the species unique enough to warrant its own genus, and transferred it into the new genus Leucopholiota in a 1996 publication.

It is distinguished by its fruit body which is covered with pointed brown, curved scales on the cap and stem, and by its white gills. Lookalike species with similar colors and scaly fruit bodies include Pholiota squarrosoides, Phaeomarasmius erinaceellus, and Leucopholiota lignicola. Found in the eastern United States, France, and Pakistan, L. decorosa is saprobic, growing on the decaying wood of hardwood trees. Although there are historical references to its consumption, its edibility is unclear.

== Taxonomy ==
The species now known as Leucopholiota decorosa was first described by Charles Peck in 1873, based on a specimen he found in New York State; he placed it in Tricholoma, then considered a subgenus of Agaricus. In 1947, Alexander Smith and Walters transferred the species into the genus Armillaria, based on its apparent close relationship to Armillaria luteovirens; the presence of clamp connections in the hyphae, the amyloid spores, and the structure of the veil and its remnants. The genus Armillaria, as it was understood at the time, would later be referred to as a "taxonomic refugium for about 270 white-spored species with attached gills and an annulus." Smith later transferred the species to the genus Tricholomopsis; however, he neglected the amyloid spores, the recurved scales of the cap cuticle, and the lack of cells known as pleurocystidia, features which should have ruled out a taxonomic transfer into the genus. In 1987, the species was transferred yet again, this time to the genus Floccularia.

The appearance of a specimen at a 1994 mushroom foray in North Carolina resulted in a collaboration between mycologists Tom Volk, Orson K. Miller, Jr. and Alan Bessette, who renamed the species Leucopholiota decorosa in a 1996 Mycologia publication. Leucopholiota was originally a subgenus of Armillaria, but the authors raised it to generic level to accommodate L. decorosa, which would become the type species. In 2008, Henning Knudsen considered L. decorosa to be the same species as what was then known as Amylolepiota lignicola, and considered the two names to be synonymous. However, Finnish mycologist Harri Harmaja rejected this interpretation. Originally, Harmaja believed Lepiota lignicola sufficiently distinct from other similar taxa to deserve its own genus Amylolepiota, which he described in a 2002 publication. He changed his mind in 2010, writing "the differences between the type species of both genera are small and are thus best considered as differences at the species level"; with this he transferred the taxon to Leucopholiota, and it is now known as Leucopholiota lignicola, the second species in genus Leucopholiota.

The genus name Leucopholiota means "white Pholiota" (from λευκός, leukós), referring to the gills and the spores; it was proposed in 1980 by Henri Romagnesi who originally described it as a subgenus of Armillaria. The specific epithet decorosa, though intended for "elegant" or "handsome", actually means "decent", "respectable", "modest", or "decorous". L. decorosa is commonly known as the "decorated Pholiota".

=== Phylogeny ===
Phylogenetic analysis based on evidence from ITS and large subunit ribosomal RNA sequence data have not confirmed that Leucopholiota decorosa belongs in the family Tricholomataceae. However, the analysis does show it to be phylogenetically related to Phaeolepiota aurea, a species of unclear status in the Agaricales, and it confirms that L. decorosa does not belong in the family Agaricaceae. According to the species authors, L. decorosa would fit best in the tribe Biannularieae of the Tricholomataceae as described by Rolf Singer in his comprehensive monograph on the Agaricales. This tribe also contains the genera Catathelasma and Armillaria.

== Description ==
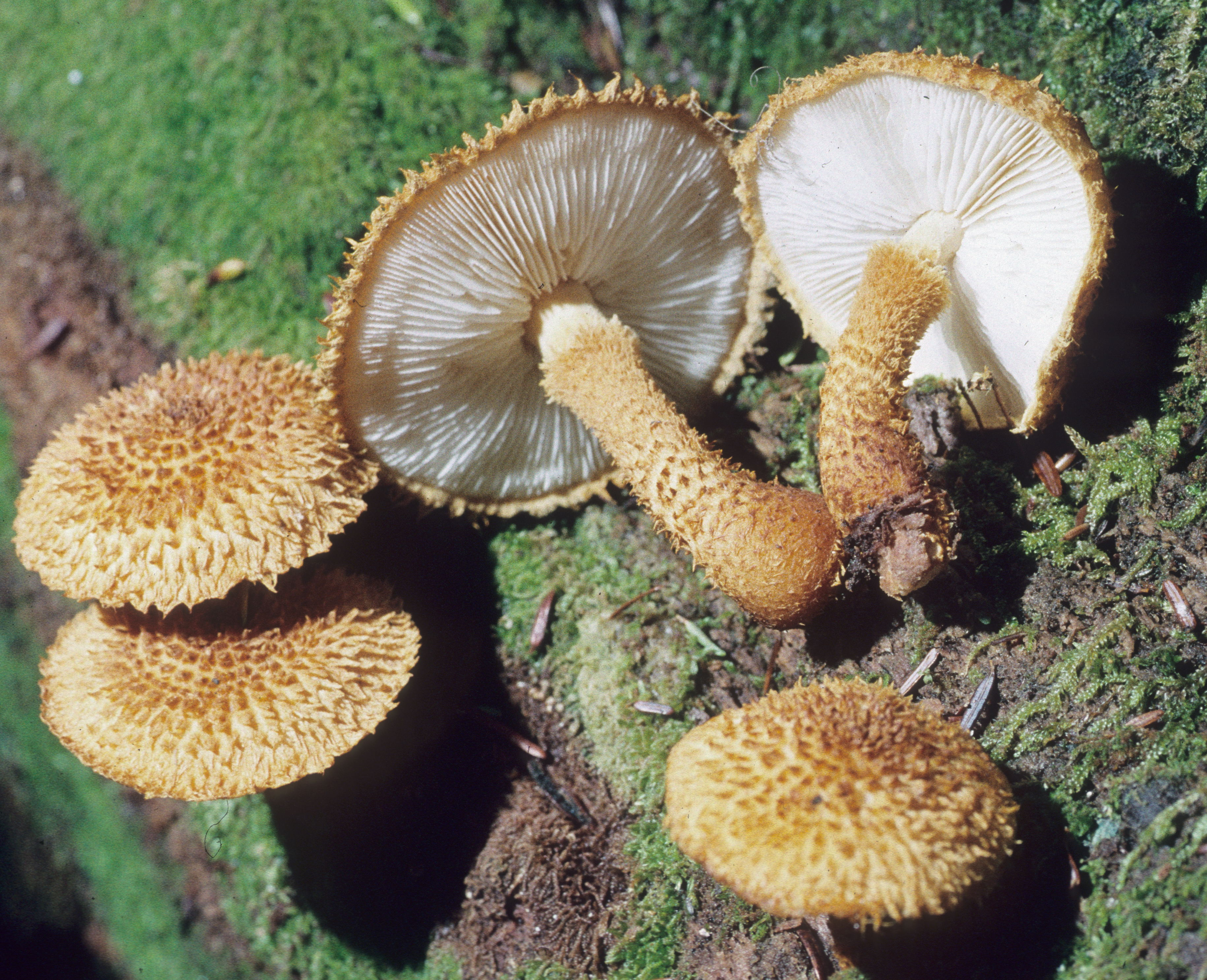
The gills of the mushroom are closely spaced and white.

The caps of L. decorosa, initially conic or hemispherical in shape, later expand to become convex or flattened in maturity. The caps are typically between 2 and 6 cm (0.8 and 2.4 in) in diameter, with surfaces covered with many small curved brown scales. The edge of the cap is typically curved inwards and may have coarse brown fibers attached. The cap is cinnamon brown, darker in the center. The gills are spaced together closely; they have a narrow (adnexed) attachment to the stem, and their edges are "finely scalloped". The stem is 2.5 to 7.0 cm (1.0 to 2.8 in) tall by 0.6 to 1.2 cm (0.2 to 0.5 in) thick, and like the cap, is covered with scales from the bottom to the level of the annular zone; above this point the stipe is smooth. The partial veil is made up of brown fibers "that flare upward as an annulus." It is roughly the same thickness throughout the length of the stem, or may be slightly thinner near the top. The flesh is white and thick, and has a firm texture; its odor is indistinct, and the taste either mild or bitter. The spore deposit is white.

The spores are hyaline (translucent), roughly elliptical in shape, have thin walls, and are amyloid, meaning they absorb iodine stain in Melzer's reagent. Additionally, in acetocarmine stain, they appear binucleate (having two nuclei). They have dimensions of 5.5–6 (more rarely 7) by 3.5–4.0 μm. The spore-bearing cells, the basidia, are club-shaped, translucent, and four-spored. The cheilocystida (cystidia on the gill edge) are club-shaped and 19-24 by 3–5 μm. The cap cuticle is a trichodermium—a type of tissue composed of erect, long, threadlike hyphae of same or different lengths, and originating from an interwoven layer of hyphae that ascends gradually until terminal cells are somewhat parallel to each other. The trichodermal hyphae are thin-walled, measuring 7.6–22.0 μm, and stain yellowish in Melzer's reagent. The hyphae comprising the cap tissue are thin-walled and 5–10 μm in diameter, while those of the gill tissue are also thin-walled, and 3.5–7.0 μm, and interspersed with oleiferous cells (characterized by strongly refractive, homogeneous contents). Clamp connections are present in the hyphae of all tissues.

=== Similar species ===
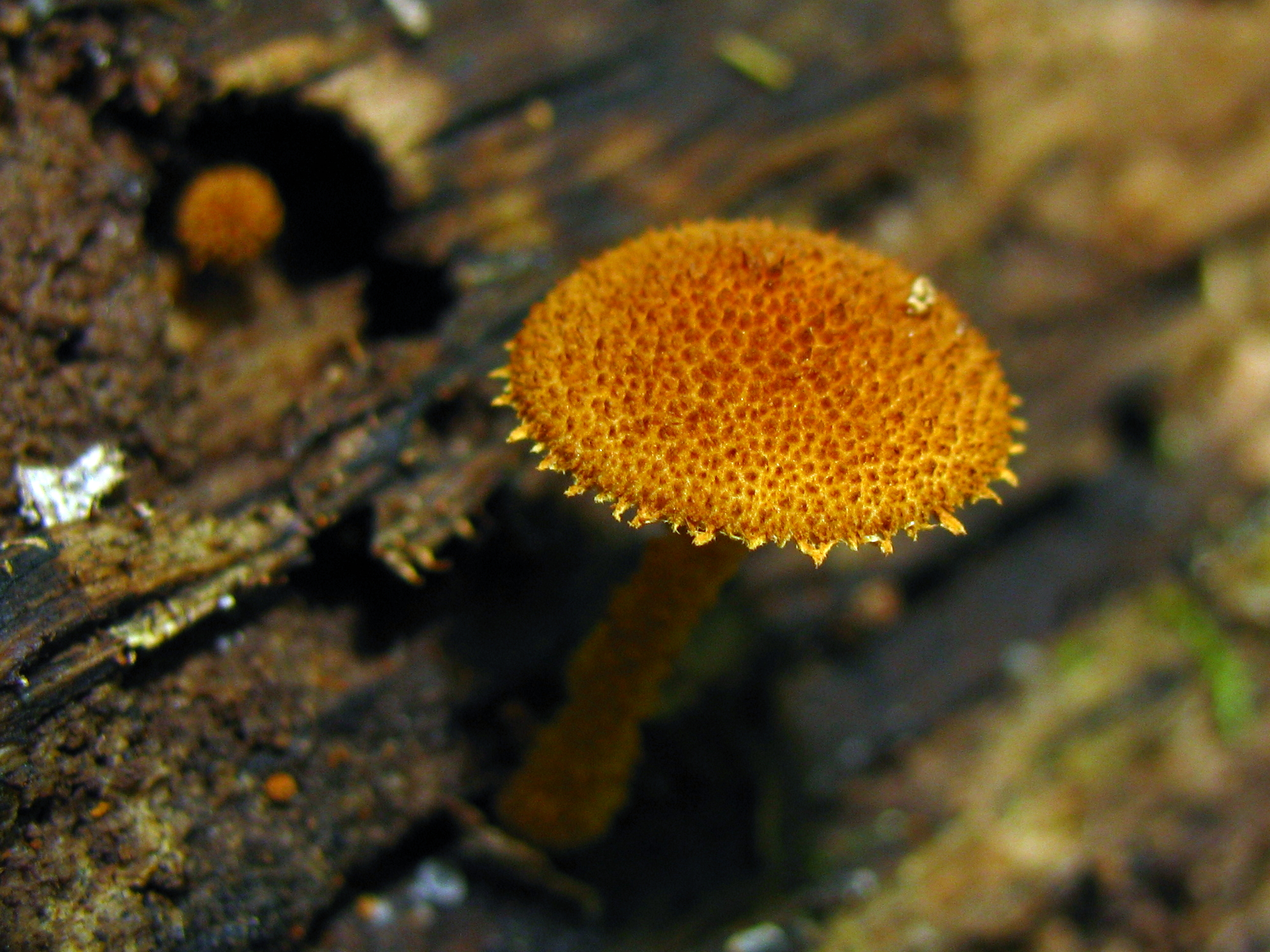
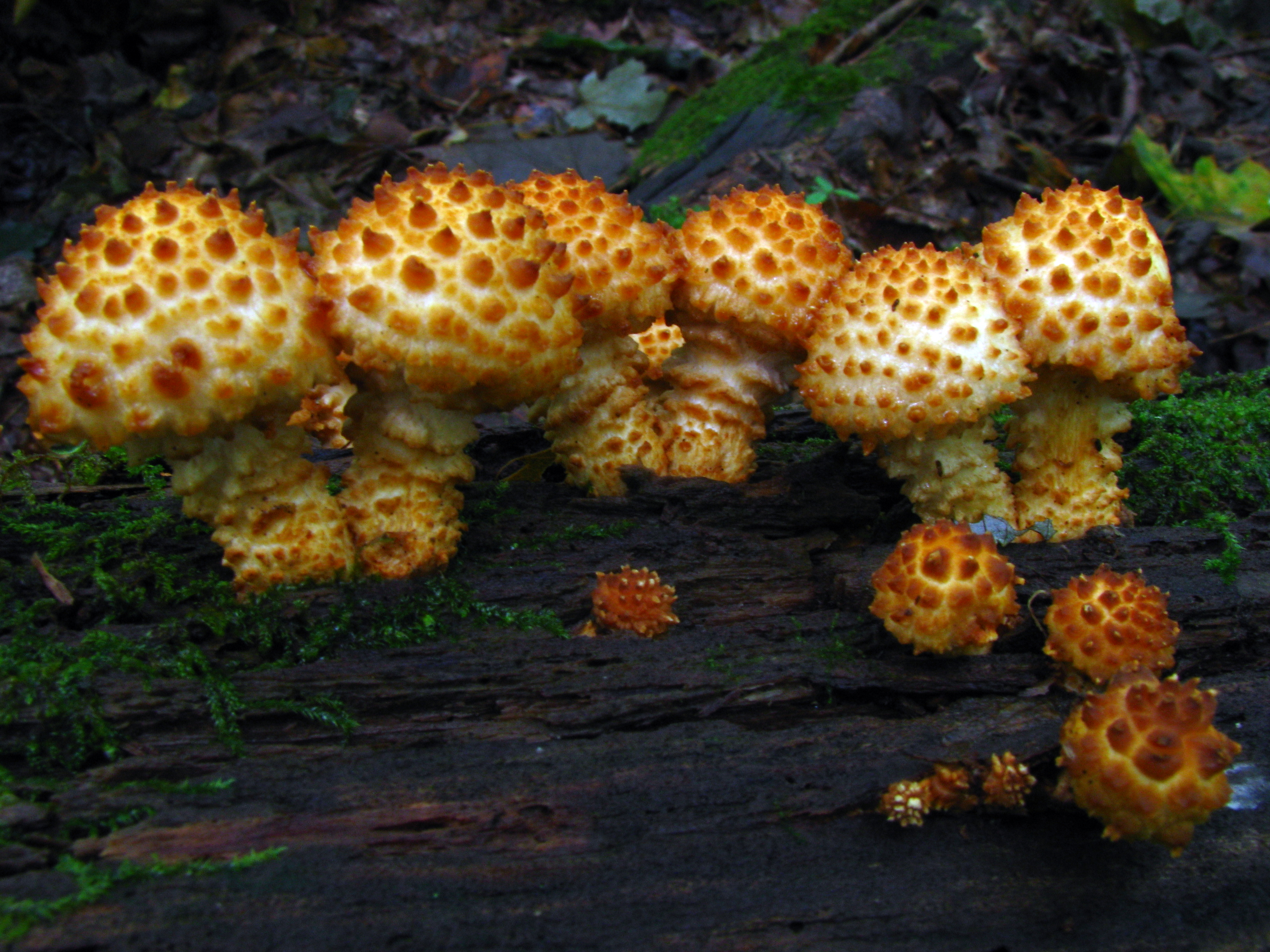
Lookalikes Phaeomarasmius erinaceus (left) and Pholiota squarrosoides (right)

The species Pholiota squarrosoides has a similar outward appearance, but it may be distinguished by its brown spores and sticky cap surface underneath the scales. In the hedgehog pholiota (Phaeomarasmius erinaceellus), the overall size is smaller—cap diameter 1 to 4 cm (0.4 to 1.6 in)—and the spores are cinnamon-brown. Some species in the genus Cystoderma also appear similar, but can be distinguished by microscopic features, like the presence of spherical (rather than club-shaped) cells in the cuticle of the cap, and also their habitat—Cystoderma usually grows on soil, rather than wood.

The only other species of Leucopholiota, L. lignicola, may be distinguished from L. decorosa by the following characteristics: free gills in L. lignicola compared with adnexed gills in L. decorosa; L. lignicola tends to grow on the wood of Birch, and preferably in old-growth forests; L. lignicola is restricted to boreal forest, compared to L. decorosa that grows in temperate regions; L. lignicola has a wide distribution throughout northern coniferous forests in Eurasia.

== Habitat and distribution ==
Leucopholiota decorosa is a saprobic species, deriving nutrients from decaying organic matter, particularly the rotting branches and stumps of deciduous trees. One field guide notes a preference for sugar maple. It grows singly or in bunches, clustered together at the base of the stem. In Ohio, it typically fruits from late September to mid November.

In addition to its known distribution in mostly eastern North America, Leucopholiota decorosa has also been collected from France. In 2007, it was reported from the Astore District of Pakistan, at an altitude of about 3,600 m (11,800 ft).

== Edibility ==
Leucopholiota decorosa was recorded as edible in 1900 by McIlvaine and MacAdam, who wrote that "it is of good consistency and flavor, having a decided mushroom taste." Later sources report the edibility as unknown.

== See also ==
- List of Tricholomataceae genera
