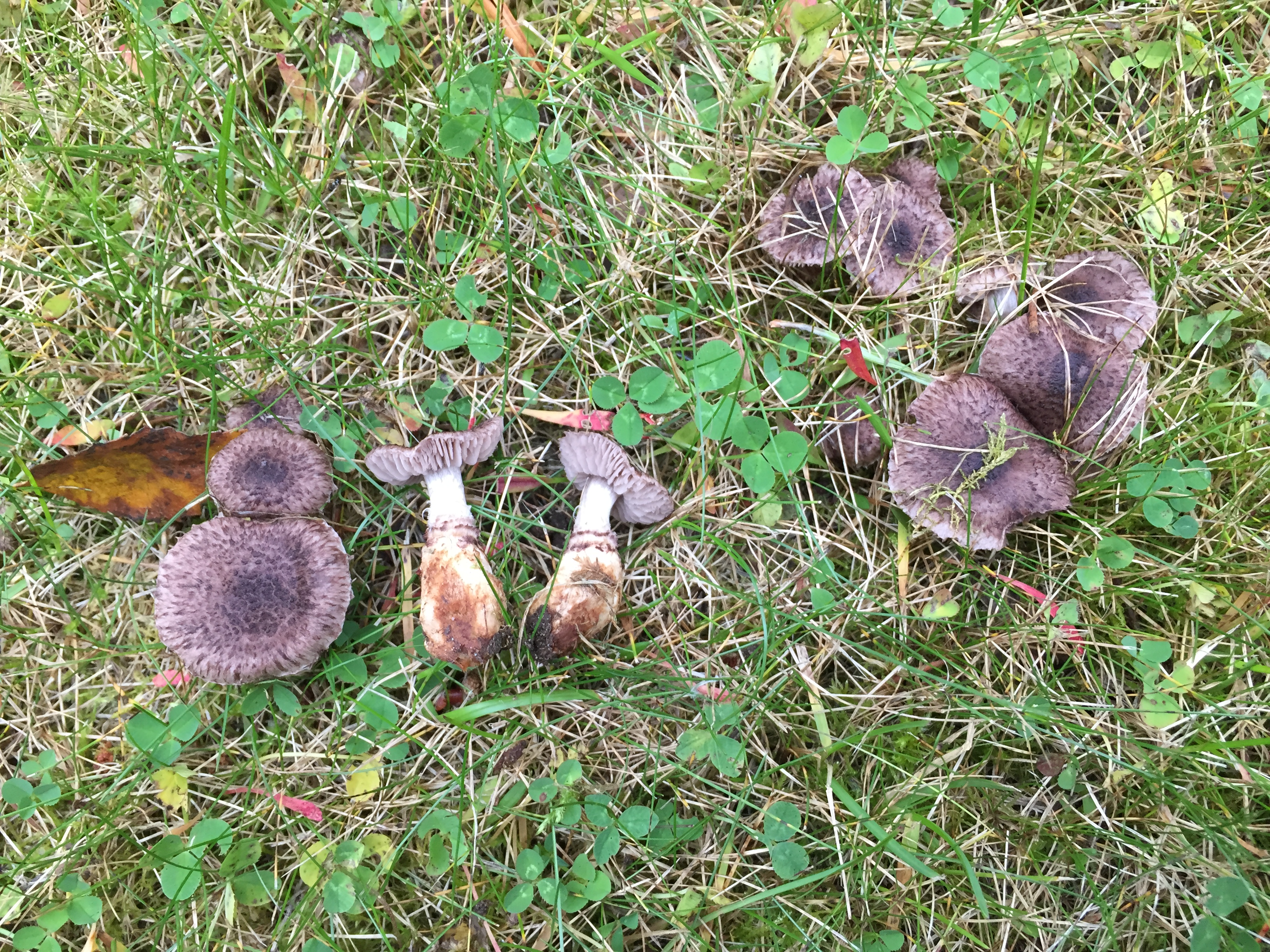
- A specimen from Rovaniemi, Finland

Scientific classification
- Kingdom: Fungi
- Division: Basidiomycota
- Class: Agaricomycetes
- Order: Agaricales
- Family: Squamanitaceae
- Genus: Dissoderma
- Species: D. odoratum

Binomial name
- Dissoderma odoratum (Cool) I. Saar & Thorn, 2022

Synonyms
- Lepiota odorata Cool; Squamanita odorata (Cool) Imbach; Tricholoma odoratum (Cool) Konrad & Maubl.

= Dissoderma odoratum =

Species of fungus

Dissoderma odoratum is a species of fungi in the family Squamanitaceae. It is a distinctly strong-smelling species with small, purple sporocarps. The fungus parasites in the sporocarps of the veiled hebeloma (Hebeloma mesophaeum), which are deformed by the parasitic fungus. Dissoderma odoratum is mostly found in Europe but has also been found from the United States. The fungus is a rare species that is classified as endangered in several European countries.

== Taxonomy ==
The fungus was first described by Dutch mycologist Catharina Cool in 1918 as Lepiota odorata. In 1946 Emil J. Imbach described genus Squamanita where the fungus was placed in to as Squamanita odorata. In 2022 Squamanita was split in half, because according to phylogenetic analysis the genus was paraphyletic. The species was moved to genus Dissoderma. Although the fungus is not the type species of its genus, it is the species known for the longest.

== Description ==
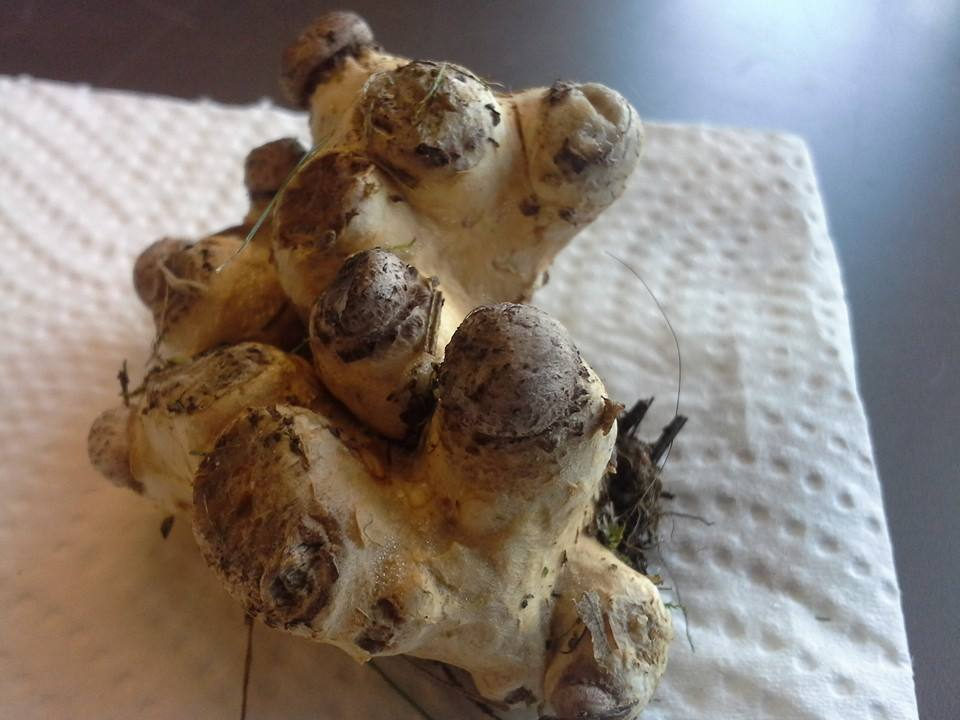
The sporocarps grown on top of a malformation consisting of a dark-colored, swollen model.

The sporocarps of D. odoratum are small and short-legged. They grow in clusters on the sporocarps of the Hebeloma mesophaeum. There can be more than ten sporocarps in one cluster, but they can also rarely grow individually.

The pileus and the upper part of the foot are coarsely scaly. The base color of the pileus is lilac gray-brown, but the scales are darker. The pileus is convex, usually 1–3 centimeters wide. The lamellae, whitish at first and later light purple or color of the pileus, are quite far apart. The stipe is whither than the pileus. The spore dust is light yellow and the spores are inamyloid (meaning that the fungus does not change color in Melzer's reagent), thin-walled and ellipsoid or ovoid in shape. The length of a spore is 6,5–9,5 micrometers and width 4–6 micrometers.

D. odoratum is an easily identifiable mushroom. The species has a strong sweet scent, which has been as caramel-like or fruity.

== Habitat ==
The habitat of D. odoratum is determined by the presence of its host species. The host species is a mycorrhizal fungi that usually grows with pine, spruce, beech, willow or birch. The host species is found from a variety of habitats, such as deciduous and coniferous forests, sand dunes, parks and gardens.

A significant part of observations have been recorded from human-modified areas, such as in the edges of public paths and lawns. It has been suggested that H. mesophaeum could be more vulnerable to parasitism in human-made environment.

The fungus can grow in a suitable habitat for a long time. For example, in Switzerland, the species grew in the same place for more than 13 years. It is unclear how this is possible, as the fungus is known to be parasitic only on spores and not on underground fungal mycelium. One possibility is that the species leaves chlamydospores behind, which always re-germinate on the sporocarps of the host.

== Distribution ==
The fungus was originally found from The Netherlands in 1915. The species was first considered endemic, but in 1948 it was found in Denmark and later from other European countries. By 2016 the fungi was also found from Belgium, Great Britain, Italy, Norway, Poland, France, Sweden, Germany, Finland and Switzerland.

In the 2020s, studies have been published using metabarcoding based on DNA sequencing of environmental samples have been published. This way the presence of D. odoratum in Estonia and Latvia was revealed although no spores have been found. Based on the environmental samples, the species seems to occur in Russia as well.

D. odoratum is primarily a European species, but in 1951 it was found in the Washington state in the United States. Species identification was genetically confirmed in 2022, and it is the only discovery from North America so far. The observations from Japan were found to represent a different species Dissoderma phaeolepioticola, whose host species is the golden bootleg (Phaeolepiota aurea).

== Ecology ==
D. odoratum is a parasitic fungus that transforms its host's sporocarp into ochre-colored, tuber-like deformity where the original cap and foot have atrophied. The deformation, consisting of the host's swollen trama and the filaments of the parasitic fungus is no longer recognized as a veiled hebeloma, but it may still smell and taste like radish.

Among the parasitic fungi of its family, the D. odoratum is the only one whose host species is known to belong to the genus Hebeloma. Because the fungus grows on spores that are deformed beyond recognition, it took a long time to confirm its host fungus. However, the species had been found in Denmark in association with the veiled hebeloma, which gave it a candidate as a possible host species. Confirmation of the matter was obtained with a molecular study published in 2007. It is not known whether the fungus also grow on other species of Hebeloma.

Several other species of the same genus are poisonous. The fungi is inedible and has been described as potentially poisonous.

National threat assessments
| Country | Uhanalaisuusarvio | Vuosi | Lähde |
|---|---|---|---|
| Netherlands | Endangered species | 2009 | |
| Norway | Vulnerable | 2021 | |
| Sweden | Data deficient | 2020 | |
| Finland | Least-concern | 2019 | |
| Switzerland | Critically Endangered | 2007 | |
| Denmark | Vulnerable | 2019 | |

== Endangerment ==
The International Union for Conservation of Nature (IUCN) has not assessed the endangerment of the species. The species is considered very rare worldwide.
