= Squamanita contortipes =

Scientific classification
- Kingdom: Fungi
- Division: Basidiomycota
- Class: Agaricomycetes
- Order: Agaricales
- Family: Squamanitaceae
- Genus: Squamanita
- Species: S. contortipes

Binomial name
- Squamanita contortipes (A.H.Sm. & D.E.Stuntz) Heinem. & Thoen (1973)

Synonyms
- Cystoderma contortipes A.H.Sm. & D.E.Stuntz (1957); Squamanita scotica Bas (1965) nom. prov. & invalid.

Species of fungus

Squamanita contortipes is a small mushroom species in the family Squamanitaceae, formerly in the Tricholomataceae. It was originally described in 1957 by American mycologist Alexander H. Smith and Daniel Elliot Stuntz as a member of Cystoderma. Paul Heinemann and David Thoen transferred it to the genus Squamanita in 1973. Discovery of an unusual fruiting of this species where three fruitbodies grew on one, still fertile host pileus which was a species of Galerina proved that Squamanita was a mycoparasitic genus. Photos of this fruiting were published in 1994 and immediately republished and highlighted in 1995 in Nature magazine where the original discovery article was featured. The species proved to be the Rosetta Stone for deciphering the parasite from the host in graft-like fruitings. Normally, S. contortipes only forms one fruitbody on each parasitized host and the host normally fails to remain fertile and does not form its own pileus.
