= Dissoderma paradoxum =

Conservation status
- Least Concern (IUCN 3.1)

Scientific classification
- Kingdom: Fungi
- Division: Basidiomycota
- Class: Agaricomycetes
- Order: Agaricales
- Family: Squamanitaceae
- Genus: Dissoderma
- Species: D. paradoxum

Binomial name
- Dissoderma paradoxum (A.H.Sm. & Singer) Singer (1973)

Synonyms
- Cystoderma paradoxum A.H.Sm. & Singer (1948); Squamanita paradoxa (A.H.Sm. & Singer) Bas (1965)

Species of fungus

Dissoderma paradoxum, which has the recommended English name of powdercap strangler in the UK, is a species of fungus in the family Squamanitaceae. It is a parasitic fungus that grows on the fruit bodies of another fungus, Cystoderma amianthinum. It takes over the host and replaces the cap and gills with its own but retains the original stipe, creating in effect a hybrid between the two. The species was first described as Cystoderma paradoxum by American mycologists Alexander H. Smith and Rolf Singer in 1948, based on specimens collected in Mount Hood National Forest in Oregon. Cornelis Bas transferred the species to the genus Squamanita in 1965. Recent molecular research, based on cladistic analysis of DNA sequences, has however shown that the species does not belong in Squamanita sensu stricto but in the related genus Dissoderma. The species occurs in both North America and Europe.
