= Squamanita citricolor =

Scientific classification
- Domain: Eukaryota
- Kingdom: Fungi
- Division: Basidiomycota
- Class: Agaricomycetes
- Order: Agaricales
- Family: Squamanitaceae
- Genus: Squamanita
- Species: S. citricolor

Binomial name
- Squamanita citricolor Thoen (1998)

Species of fungus

Squamanita citricolor is a species of fungus in the family Squamanitaceae. Found in the Democratic Republic of the Congo , it was first described as new to science in 1998. Fruit bodies of the fungus have a yellow cap, and a whitish to yellowish stipe originating from a yellowish, deeply rooting basal bulb in the shape of an inverted cone. Microscopically, the fungus features very thick-walled spindle-shaped (fusiform) pleurocystidia and cheilocystidia.
