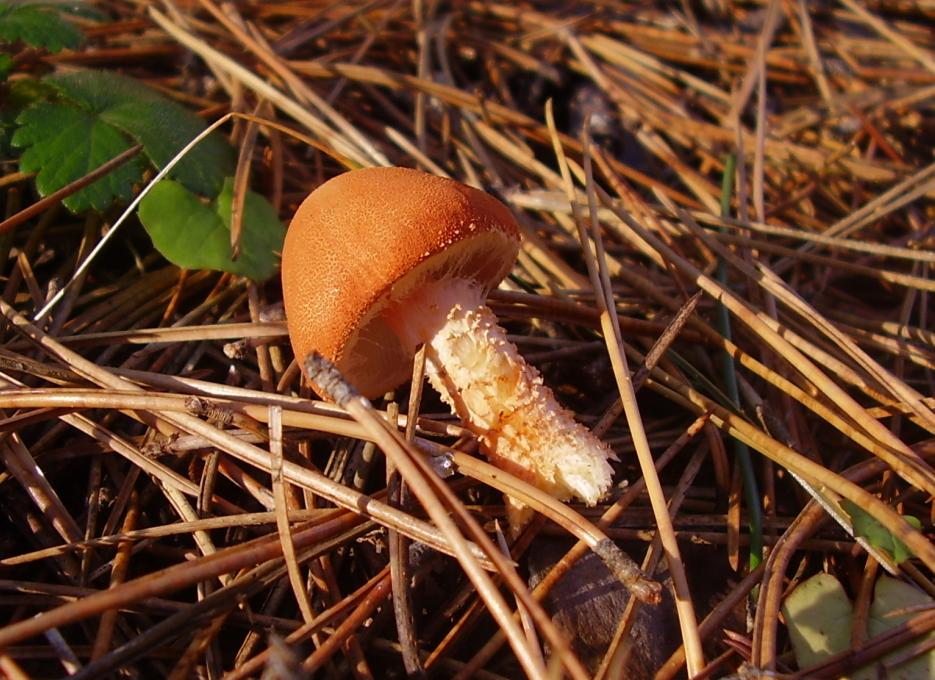

Scientific classification
- Kingdom: Fungi
- Division: Basidiomycota
- Class: Agaricomycetes
- Order: Agaricales
- Family: Agaricaceae
- Genus: Cystodermella
- Species: C. cinnabarina

Binomial name
- Cystodermella cinnabarina (Alb. & Schwein.) Harmaja

Synonyms
- Agaricus granulosus var. cinnabarinus Agaricus terreyi Armillaria cinnabarina Cystoderma cinnabarinum Cystoderma terreyi Lepiota cinnabarina Lepiota terreyi

= Cystodermella cinnabarina =

Species of fungus

Cystodermella cinnabarina
- Mycological characteristics
- Gills on hymenium
- Cap is convex or flat
- Hymenium is emarginate or adnate
- Stipe has a ring
- Spore print is white
- Ecology is saprotrophic
- Edibility is not recommended

Cystodermella cinnabarina is a basidiomycete fungus of the genus Cystodermella. Its fruiting body is a small agaric bearing a distinctive reddish-coloured grainy cap. It occurs in coniferous and deciduous forests throughout the world. Prior to 2002, this species belonged to genus Cystoderma, subsection Cinnabarina, under the name Cystoderma cinnabarinum which is still sometimes applied. Another often used synonym is Cystoderma terreyi.

== Taxonomy ==
The species was first described as Agaricus granulosus var. cinnabarinus by German botanist Johannes Baptista von Albertini and the American Lewis David de Schweinitz in 1805. The species has also been known variously as Agaricus terreyi (Berkeley and Broome, 1870), Armillaria cinnabarina (Kauffman, 1922), Lepiota cinnabarina (Karsten, 1914), and Cystoderma terreyi (Harmaja, 1978).

== Description ==
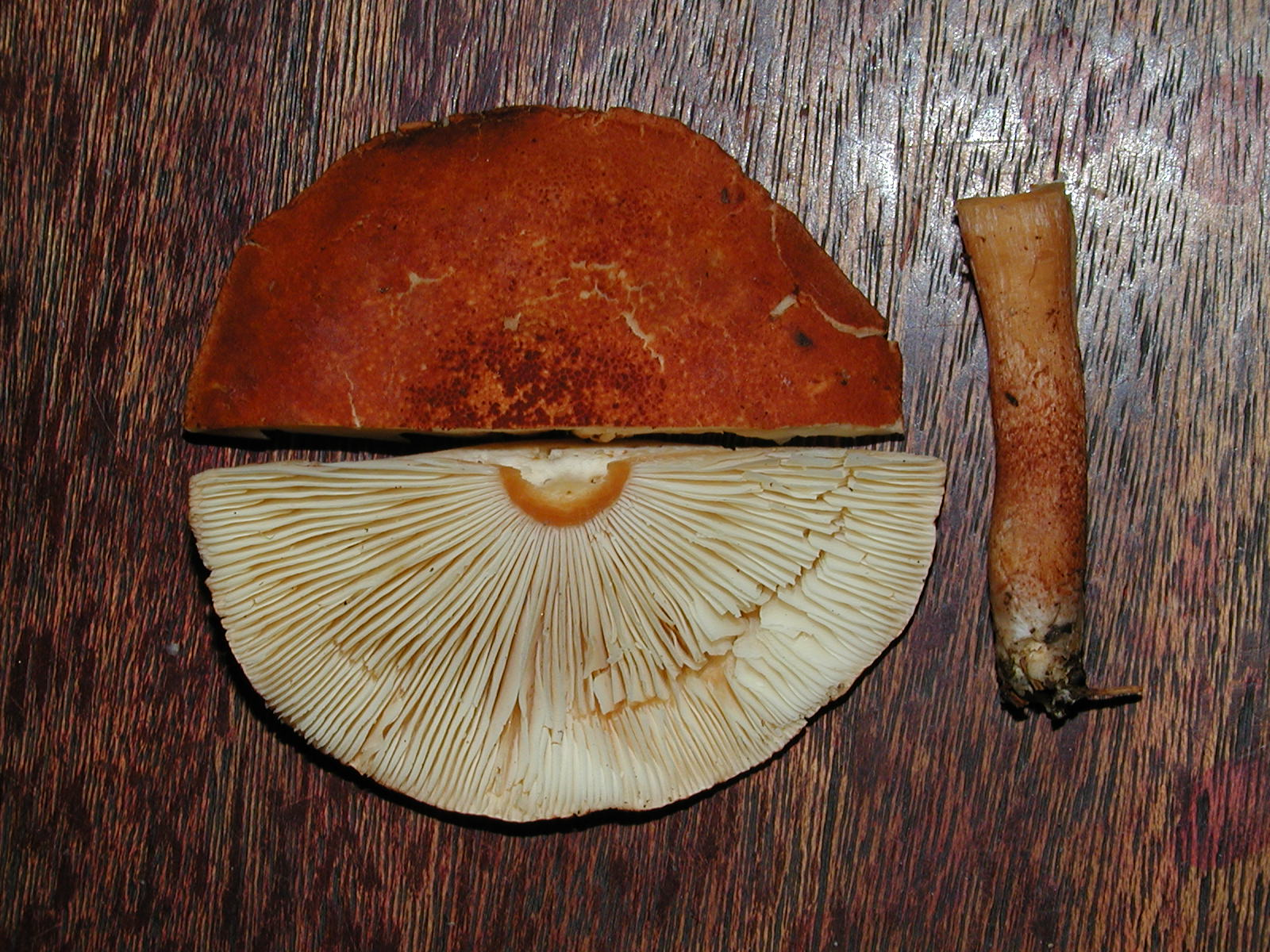
View of the cap, gills, and stem

The cap is hemispherical in shape at first, becoming convex and finally flat with maturity, and up to 5.5 cm (2.2 in) wide. The cap cuticle is cinnabar, brick-red or rusty orange and densely covered with fine granules. The flesh is white to pallid, with a mild to sweet taste and mild to mealy smell. The gills are white to cream, dense and emarginate or adnate. A finely cottony partial veil covers the gills in immature specimens, tearing away to leave behind a delicate ring. The stem is white above the ring, and scaly below, with dark orange squamules. The stem is up to 6 cm (2.4 in) tall and 1.5 cm (0.6 in) in diameter, sometimes bulbous in the base and hollow.

=== Microscopic characteristics ===
The basidiospores are oval, hyaline, and non-amyloid, with dimensions of 3.5–5 by 2.5–3.5 μm. The spore print is white. The basidia (spore-producing cells) are club-shaped, and 17–24 by 4–5 μm. C. cinnabarina always has cells called cheilocystidia—cystidia that are present on the edges of gills, which in this species are spear-shaped. This microscopic feature may be used to help distinguish it from the similar-coloured C. adnatifolia and C. granulosa, which also bear non-amyloid spores, but lack cystidia.

Species of Cystoderma (including orange-capped species such as Cystoderma amianthinum) have amyloid spores, in comparison to non-amyloid spores in C. cinnabarina and species of Cystodermella in general. This is determined by staining tissue with chemicals in the amyloid reaction—all Cystodermella species show a negative reaction (spores remaining colourless).

== Habitat and distribution ==
Cystodermella cinnabarina is found fruiting in coniferous and deciduous forests, on ground among moss, grass and litter. Being a saprotrophic fungus, it decays dead organic matter. It has been recorded under pine (Pinus nigra, Pinus pinea), oak, spruce (Picea orientalis), fir (Abies cephalonica) and chestnut (Castanea sativa) in Greece and Turkey. Fruiting bodies appear solitary or in small groups, during the summer and autumn. It is widely distributed around the world on continents including Asia, Africa, Europe and North America, though in many places it is uncommon. The preliminary red data list of threatened British fungi lists Cystodermella cinnabarinum under the IUCN "Near Threatened" status.

== Edibility ==
Cystodermella cinnabarina has been variously described as inedible, though harmless, and even edible regionally, for example, in Hong Kong.
