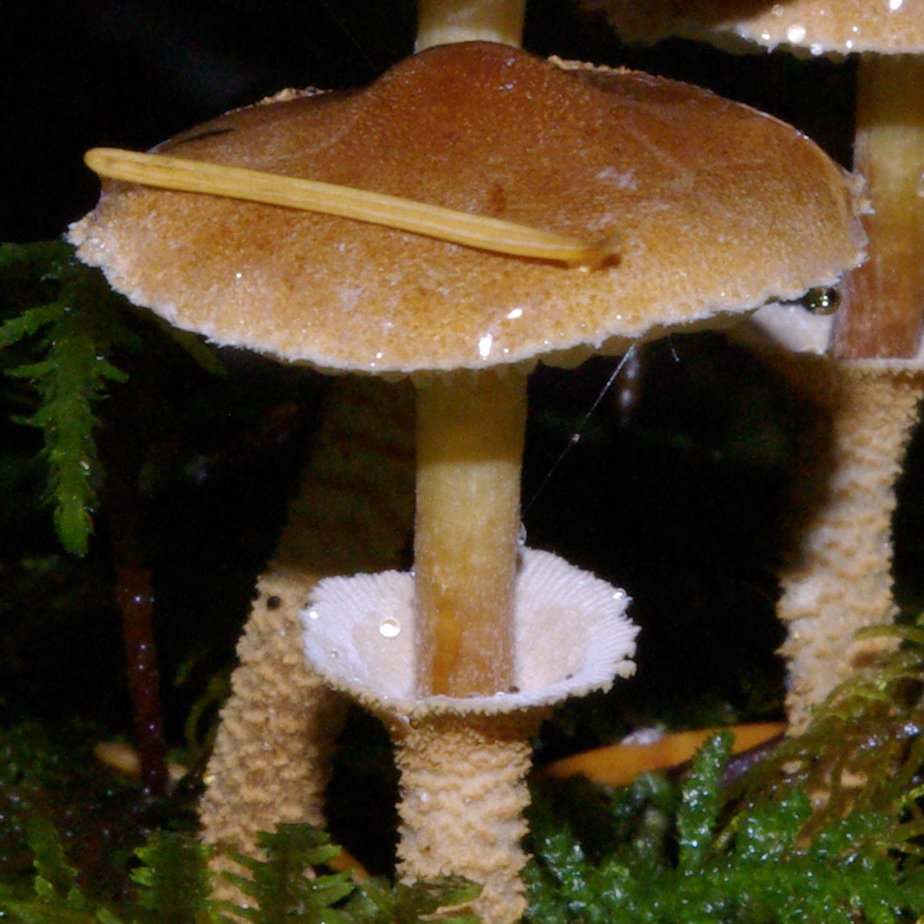

Scientific classification
- Kingdom: Fungi
- Division: Basidiomycota
- Class: Agaricomycetes
- Order: Agaricales
- Family: Squamanitaceae
- Genus: Cystoderma
- Species: C. carcharias
- Variety: C. c. var. fallax

Trinomial name
- Cystoderma carcharias var. fallax (A.H. Sm. & Singer) I. Saar

Synonyms
- Cystoderma fallax

= Cystoderma carcharias var. fallax =

Cystoderma carcharias var. fallax
- Mycological characteristics
- Gills on hymenium
- Cap is convex or umbonate
- Hymenium is adnexed
- Stipe has a ring
- Spore print is white
- Edibility is unknown

Cystoderma carcharias var. fallax, commonly known as the sheathed powdercap, is a mushroom in the genus Cystoderma.

== Description ==
Cystoderma carcharias var. fallax has a tan or brown cap that is covered in scales or granules. It is about 1.5–5 centimetres (0.59–1.97 in) wide. The stipe is about 3–7 centimetres (1.2–2.8 in) tall and about 0.3–0.5 centimetres (0.12–0.20 in) wide.

== Habitat and ecology ==
Cystoderma carcharias var. fallax grows on rotten logs, in moss, and in conifer needles. It fruits in the fall.
