= Squamanita schreieri =

Conservation status
- Endangered (IUCN 3.1)

Scientific classification
- Kingdom: Fungi
- Division: Basidiomycota
- Class: Agaricomycetes
- Order: Agaricales
- Family: Squamanitaceae
- Genus: Squamanita
- Species: S. schreieri

Binomial name
- Squamanita schreieri Imbach (1946)

Species of fungus

Squamanita schreieri is a species of fungus in the order Agaricales and the type species of the genus Squamanita. It is parasitic on basidiocarps (fruit bodies] of the ectomycorrhizal fungi Amanita solitaria and A. strobiliformis, replacing their caps with its own. The species was first described scientifically by Swiss mycologist Emil J. Imbach in 1946. It is only known from a few sites in central mainland Europe and threats to its habitat (hardwood forests) have resulted in the species being assessed as globally "endangered" on the IUCN Red List of Threatened Species.
