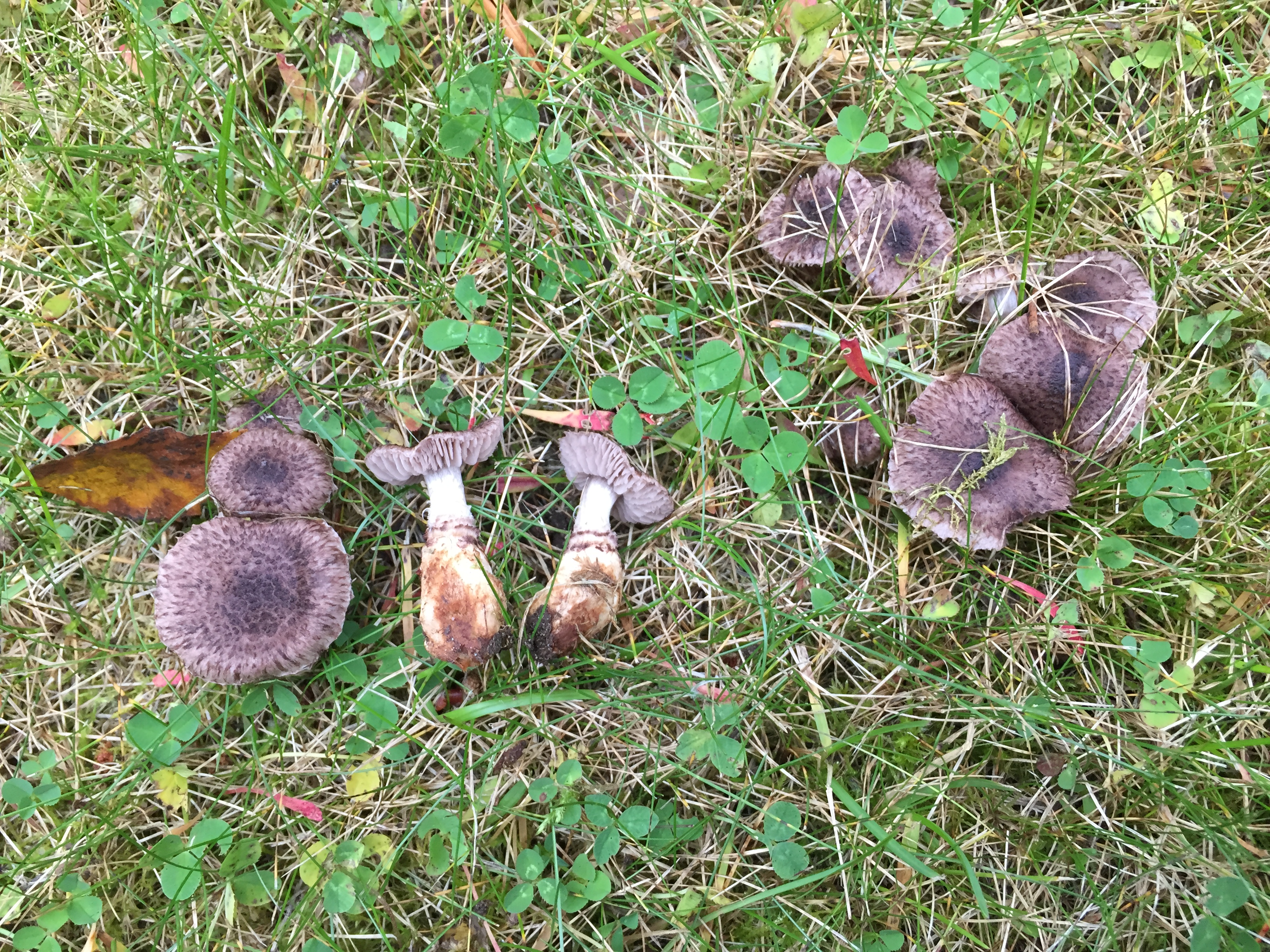
- Dissoderma odoratum, Finland

Scientific classification
- Kingdom: Fungi
- Division: Basidiomycota
- Class: Agaricomycetes
- Order: Agaricales
- Family: Squamanitaceae
- Genus: Dissoderma (A.H. Sm. & Singer) Singer (1973)

Type species
- Dissoderma paradoxum (A.H. Sm. & Singer) Singer (1973)

Species
- Dissoderma contortipes; Dissoderma fimbriatum; Dissoderma galerinicola; Dissoderma odoratum; Dissoderma paradoxum; Dissoderma pearsonii; Dissoderma phaeolepioticola; Dissoderma stuntzii

Synonyms
- Coolia Huijsman (1943) nom. inval.; Cystoderma subg. Dissoderma A.H. Sm. & Singer (1948)

= Dissoderma =

Genus of fungi

Dissoderma is a genus of parasitic fungi in the family Squamanitaceae. Basidiocarps (fruit bodies) superficially resemble normal agarics (gilled mushrooms) but emerge from parasitized fruit bodies of deformed host agarics.

== Taxonomy ==
Dissoderma was created in 1948 as a subgenus of Cystoderma and raised to generic rank in 1973. Though French mycologist Marcel Bon recognized and expanded the genus in 1999, most other mycologists considered Dissoderma synonymous with Squamanita. Molecular research, based on cladistic analysis of DNA sequences, has however confirmed Dissoderma as a genus distinct from Squamanita. A number of species previously referred to Squamanita have accordingly been transferred to Dissoderma.

== Description ==
Dissoderma species can be distinguished from Squamanita species by their violet-grey pilei (caps) and upper stipes (stems). The lower parts of the stipes are host tissue and as such are often distinct and differently coloured. Known hosts include species of Cystoderma, Galerina, and Hebeloma.

== See also ==
- List of Agaricales genera
