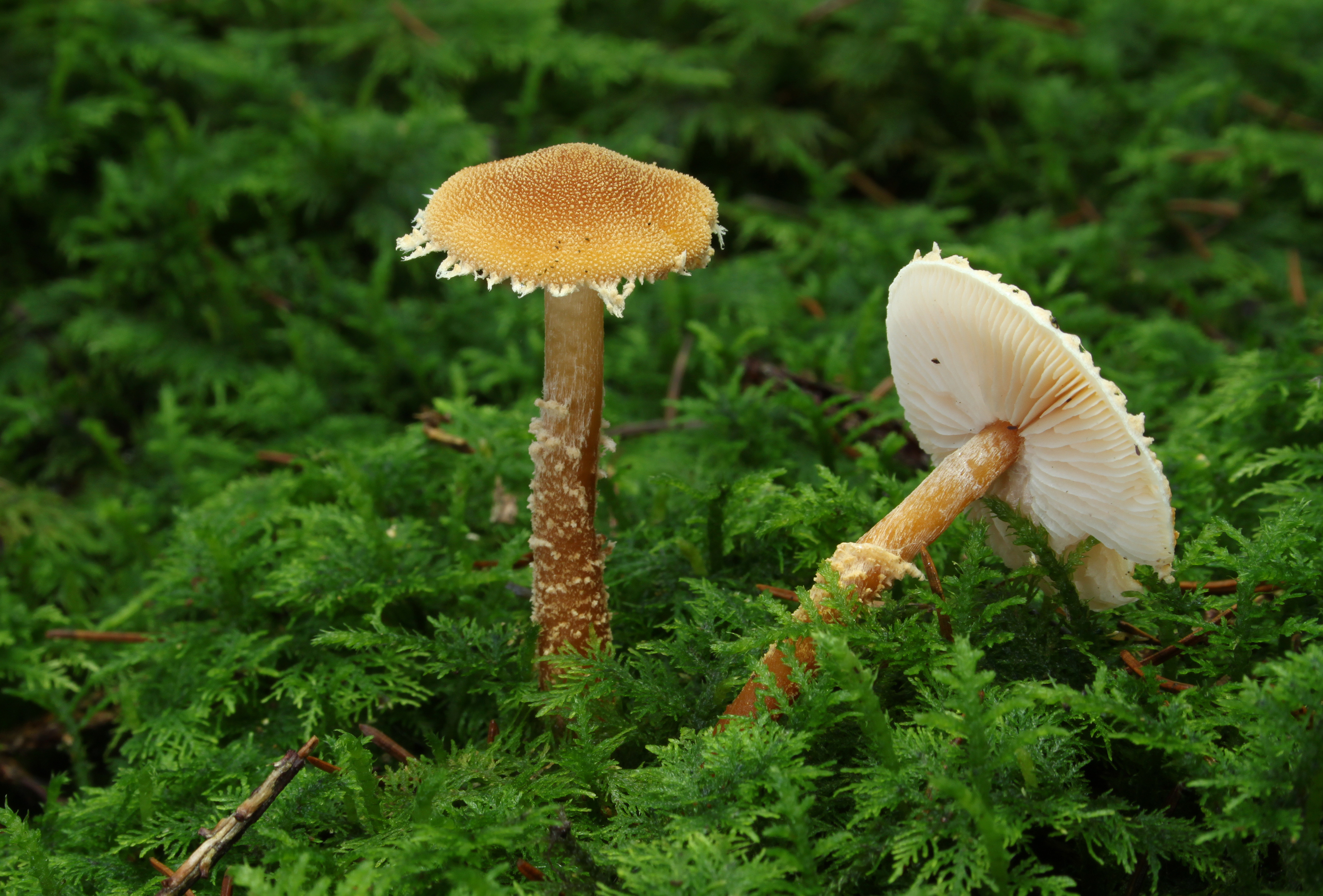

Scientific classification
- Kingdom: Fungi
- Division: Basidiomycota
- Class: Agaricomycetes
- Order: Agaricales
- Family: Squamanitaceae
- Genus: Cystoderma
- Species: C. amianthinum

Binomial name
- Cystoderma amianthinum (Scop.) Fayod (1889)

Synonyms
- Agaricus amianthinus Scop. (1772)

= Cystoderma amianthinum =

Species of fungus

Cystoderma amianthinum Mycological characteristics
- Gills on hymenium
- Cap is convex or umbonate
- Hymenium is adnexed
- Stipe has a ring
- Spore print is white
- Ecology is saprotrophic
- Edibility is not recommended

Cystoderma amianthinum, commonly called the common powdercap, saffron parasol, the saffron powder-cap, or the earthy powder-cap, is a small orange-ochre, or yellowish-brown, gilled mushroom. It grows in damp mossy grassland, in coniferous forest clearings, or on wooded heaths. It is probably the most common of the small genus Cystoderma. It is not recommended for consumption due to its resemblance to poisonous species.

== Taxonomy ==
Cystoderma amianthinum was first noted by the Italian-Austrian naturalist Giovanni Antonio Scopoli, who called it Agaricus amianthinus in 1772. The present generic name Cystoderma was erected by Swiss mycologist Victor Fayod in 1889, and is roughly translated as 'blistered skin', and is probably a reference to the appearance of the pellicle (cap skin).

== Description ==
The cap is between 1 and 5 cm (0.5 and 2 in) in diameter, convex to bell-shaped, and later flat with a slight depression around a low umbo (central boss). It is dry and powdery, often with a shaggy or fringed margin (appendiculate), and is saffron-yellow or orange-ochre. The stem is cylindrical, and has a flaky-granular sheath beneath a fleeting, powdery ring. The gills are white initially, and become creamy later. They are adnexed (narrowly attached to the stem), and initially quite crowded. The spore print is white. The flesh is thin and yellowish, with an odor that is unpleasant or resembles husked corn.

A very similar form with a markedly radially wrinkled cap, has been separated by some authors, and given the binomial Cystoderma rugoso-reticulatum. Some forms have a whitish yellow cap.

Cystodermella granulosa and Cystodermella cinnabarina are both redder as a rule, and have adnate gills (broadly attached to the stem).

== Distribution and habitat ==
Cystoderma amianthinum is widespread in Europe and North America, and common in northern temperate zones. It occurs in mossy woodland, on heaths, amongst grass or bracken, and sometimes with willow. It is often found on acidic soils.

== Edibility ==
Eating is not advised as the deadly toxic Lepiota castanea is a lookalike.
