= Cystoderma granuliferum =

Scientific classification
- Kingdom: Fungi
- Division: Basidiomycota
- Class: Agaricomycetes
- Order: Agaricales
- Family: Squamanitaceae
- Genus: Cystoderma
- Species: C. granuliferum

Binomial name
- Cystoderma granuliferum (Bas & Læssøe) I. Saar (2022)

Synonyms
- Squamanita granulifera Bas & Læssøe (1999)

Species of fungus

Cystoderma granuliferum is a species of fungus in the family Squamanitaceae. It is found in the Amazonian region of Ecuador, where it grows on the rotting wood of dicotyledons. The fungus was described as new to science in 1999 by mycologists Cornelis Bas and Thomas Læssøe. Molecular research, based on cladistic analysis of DNA sequences, has shown that it belongs in the genus Cystoderma.
