= Cystoderma chocoanum =

Scientific classification
- Kingdom: Fungi
- Division: Basidiomycota
- Class: Agaricomycetes
- Order: Agaricales
- Family: Squamanitaceae
- Genus: Cystoderma
- Species: C. chocoanum

Binomial name
- Cystoderma chocoanum Franco-Mol.

Species of fungus

Cystoderma chocoanum is a species of mushroom in the family Agaricaceae. Described as new to science in 1993, it was originally found in the tropical lowlands of Colombia, growing on decaying wood. The specific epithet chocoanum refers to the Department of Chocó in Colombia. It has also been reported from Brazil.
