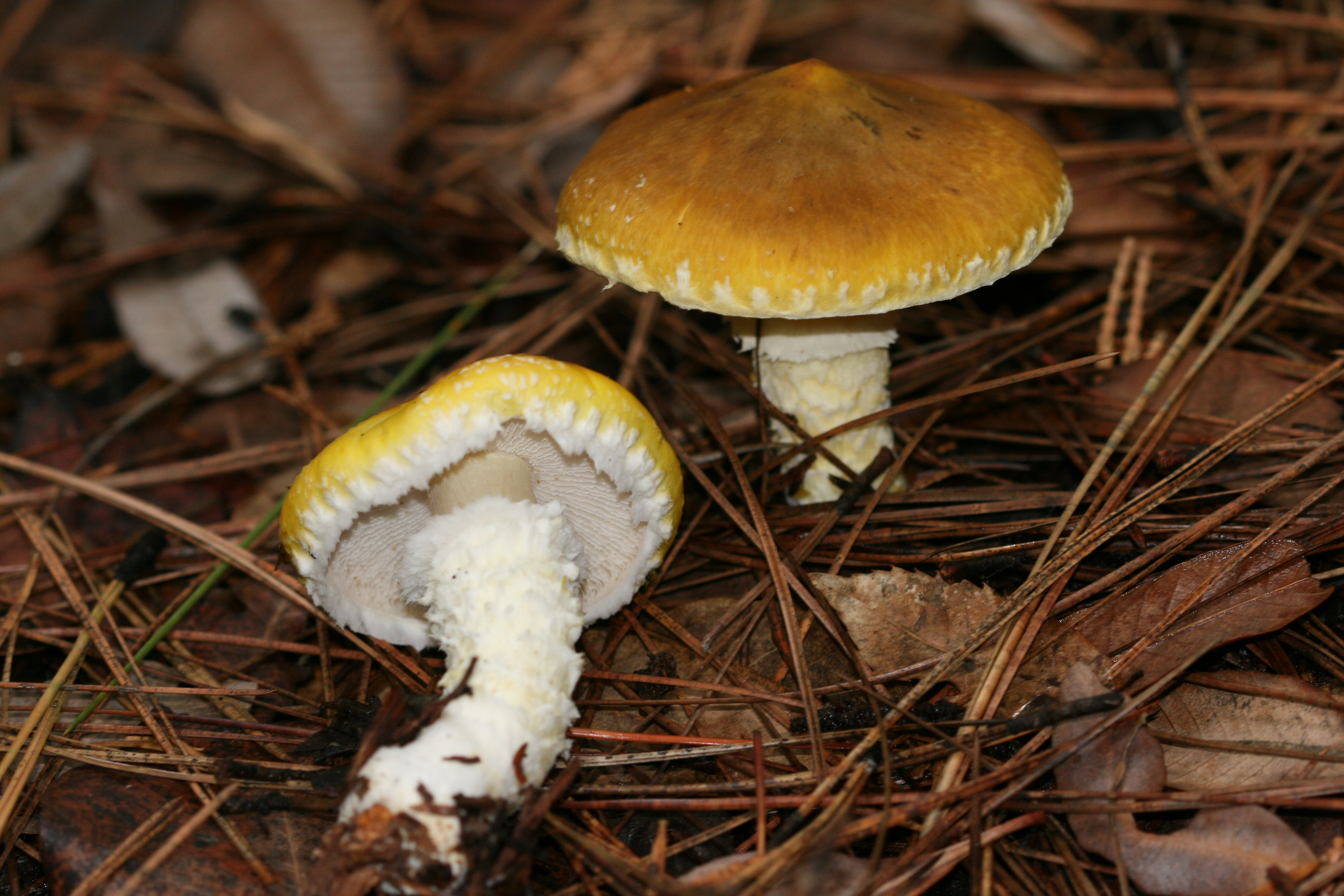
- Floccularia albolanaripes

Scientific classification
- Kingdom: Fungi
- Division: Basidiomycota
- Class: Agaricomycetes
- Order: Agaricales
- Family: Squamanitaceae
- Genus: Floccularia; Pouzar (1957)

Type species
- Floccularia straminea (Krombh.) Pouzar (1957)

Species
- F. albolanaripes F. fusca F. luteovirens F. pitkinensis

= Floccularia =

Genus of fungi

Floccularia is a genus of fungi in the order Agaricales. There are four recognized species in the genus, which have a widespread distribution, especially in northern temperate regions. Two former species are now classified as a Cercopemyces and an Amanita (or more specifically an Aspidella, Amanitaceae). Floccularia was circumscribed by Czech mycologist Zdeněk Pouzar in 1957.

Floccularia albolanaripes and F. luteovirens are known to be edible.

== See also ==
- List of Agaricaceae genera
- List of Agaricales genera
