= Leucopholiota lignicola =

Scientific classification
- Kingdom: Fungi
- Division: Basidiomycota
- Class: Agaricomycetes
- Order: Agaricales
- Family: Squamanitaceae
- Genus: Leucopholiota
- Species: L. lignicola

Binomial name
- Leucopholiota lignicola (P.Karsten) Harmaja, 2010

Species of fungus

Leucopholiota lignicola is a species of fungus belonging to the family Agaricaceae.

Synonym:

- Lepiota lignicola P.Karst., 1879 (= basionym)
