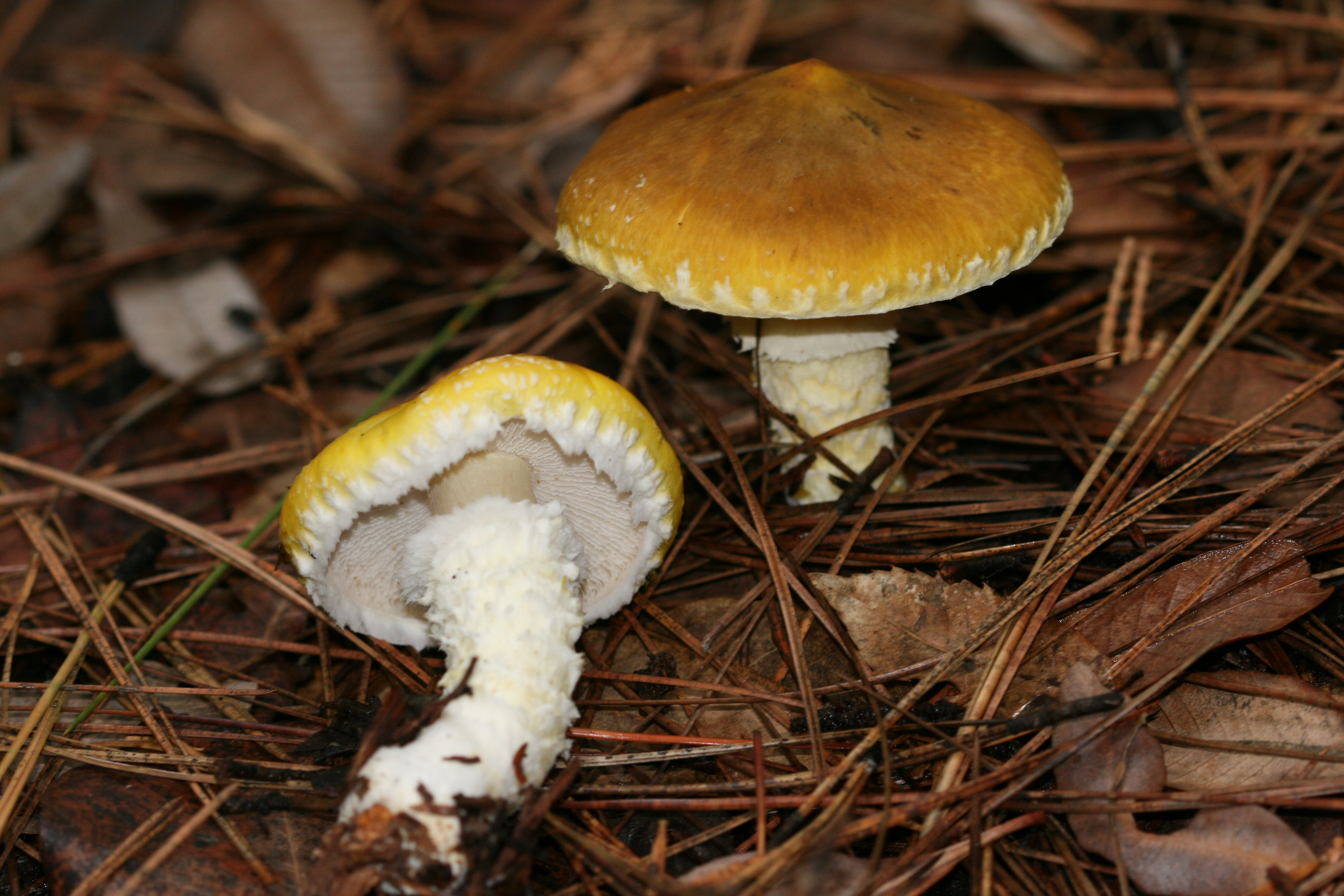

Scientific classification
- Kingdom: Fungi
- Division: Basidiomycota
- Class: Agaricomycetes
- Order: Agaricales
- Family: Squamanitaceae
- Genus: Floccularia
- Species: F. albolanaripes

Binomial name
- Floccularia albolanaripes (G.F.Atk.) Redhead (1987)

Synonyms
- Armillaria albolanaripes G.F.Atk. (1908)

= Floccularia albolanaripes =

Species of fungus

Floccularia albolanaripes
- Mycological characteristics
- Gills on hymenium
- Cap is convex or umbonate
- Hymenium is adnexed
- Stipe has a ring
- Spore print is white
- Ecology is mycorrhizal
- Edibility is edible

Floccularia albolanaripes, commonly known as golden robes, is a species of fungus in the family Agaricaceae. Mushrooms are characterized by their yellow caps with a brownish center and scales over the margin, and the conspicuous remains of a partial veil that is left on the stipe.

The species grows in the Pacific Northwest and the Rocky Mountains of North America, and in India. It is edible.

== Taxonomy ==
The species was first described as Armillaria albolanaripes by American mycologist George F. Atkinson in 1908. The type specimens were collected from Corvallis, Oregon, on November 6, 1906. It was known as an Armillaria for several decades until members of that genus with amyloid spores and lacking black rhizomorphs were transferred to Floccularia in 1987.

== Description ==
The cap is convex to flattened (sometimes with a shallow umbo), measuring 3–12 cm (1.2–4.7 in) in diameter. Its color is bright-yellow to orange-yellow and then later brownish, and it has flattened brownish scales over the center. The whitish cap margin is rolled inward. The well-separated gills have tooth-like edges, and an adnate attachment to the stipe, sometimes with a notch. They are initially white before turning cream in maturity. The stipe measures 3–8 cm (1.2–3.1 in) long by 1–2.5 cm (0.4–1.0 in) wide, and is roughly the same width throughout. Shiny with a light yellow-brown base color, it has one to several cottony zones of partial veil remnants. The flesh is firm, and white to yellow under the cap cuticle. It has no distinguishable odor and a mild taste.

The spore print is white. The spores are ellipsoid, smooth, and measure 6–8 by 4–4.5 μm.

=== Similar species ===
The base form of species Floccularia luteovirens is similar in appearance, but has a brighter yellow cap with raised scales on the surface and yellowish gills. F. luteovirens forma straminea (which has sometimes been defined as a distinct species, F. straminea) is another lookalike with similar coloration and habitat preferences, but its cap features shaggy scales arranged in concentric zones, and it has light yellow gills.

== Habitat and distribution ==
The fruit bodies grow singly to scattered under conifers. In North America, it is found in the Pacific Northwest and the Rocky Mountains, where it occurs in the spring and summer. A snowbank mushroom, it is often found around the edge of melting snowbanks, or shortly after the snow has melted. In Kashmir, India, it grows in a suspected mycorrhizal association with Pinus wallichiana.

== Uses ==
F. albolanaripes mushrooms are edible but of little flavor.
