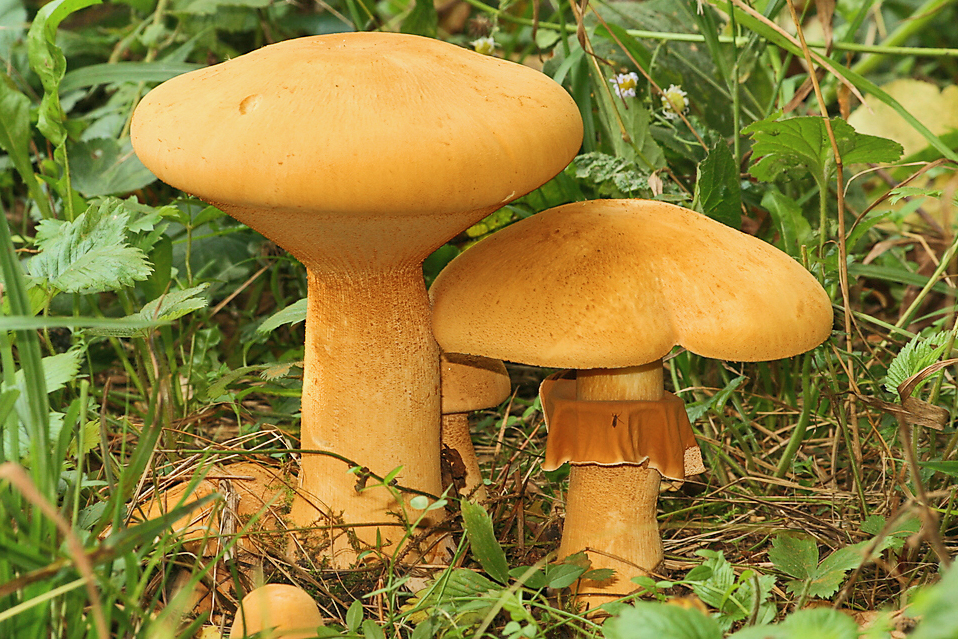
- Phaeolepiota aurea

Scientific classification
- Kingdom: Fungi
- Division: Basidiomycota
- Class: Agaricomycetes
- Order: Agaricales
- Family: Squamanitaceae
- Genus: Phaeolepiota; Maire ex Konrad & Maubl. (1928)
- Species: P. aurea

Binomial name
- Phaeolepiota aurea (Matt.) Maire (1928)

Synonyms
- Cystoderma aureum

= Phaeolepiota =

Family of fungi

Phaeolepiota aurea Mycological characteristics
- Gills on hymenium
- Cap is flat or convex
- Hymenium is free
- Stipe has a ring
- Spore print is reddish-brown
- Ecology is mycorrhizal
- Edibility is not recommended

Phaeolepiota is a genus of fungi in the family Squamanitaceae. The genus is monotypic, containing the single species Phaeolepiota aurea. Commonly known as Alaskan gold, Alaska gold, golden bootleg or golden cap, P. aurea is an agaric (gilled mushroom) found throughout North America and Eurasia – often in groups and next to nettles.

== Taxonomy ==
Recent molecular phylogenetics research shows that Phaeolepiota is closely related to and may need to be merged into the genus Cystoderma.

== Description ==
The mushroom is large and golden, and its stem has a skirt-like ring. The cap is up to 20 centimetres (8 in) wide and the stem up to 20 cm long. It has a mild smell. The spores are brown, producing a tannish spore print.

=== Similar species ===
It can resemble Cystoderma fallax, C. granosum, Gymnopilus spectabilis, and Agrocybe praecox.

== Distribution and habitat ==
It is found throughout North America and Eurasia – often in groups and next to nettles.

== Edibility ==
The fruit bodies have been considered edible and are eaten in Russia and China. It is not, however, recommended for consumption as it is known to cause gastrointestinal upset. Studies have shown that this fungus contains unacceptable amounts of both cadmium and cyanide compounds. Cooking reduces the concentration of the cyanide compounds present, which may be the reason why it has been consumed in some countries.
