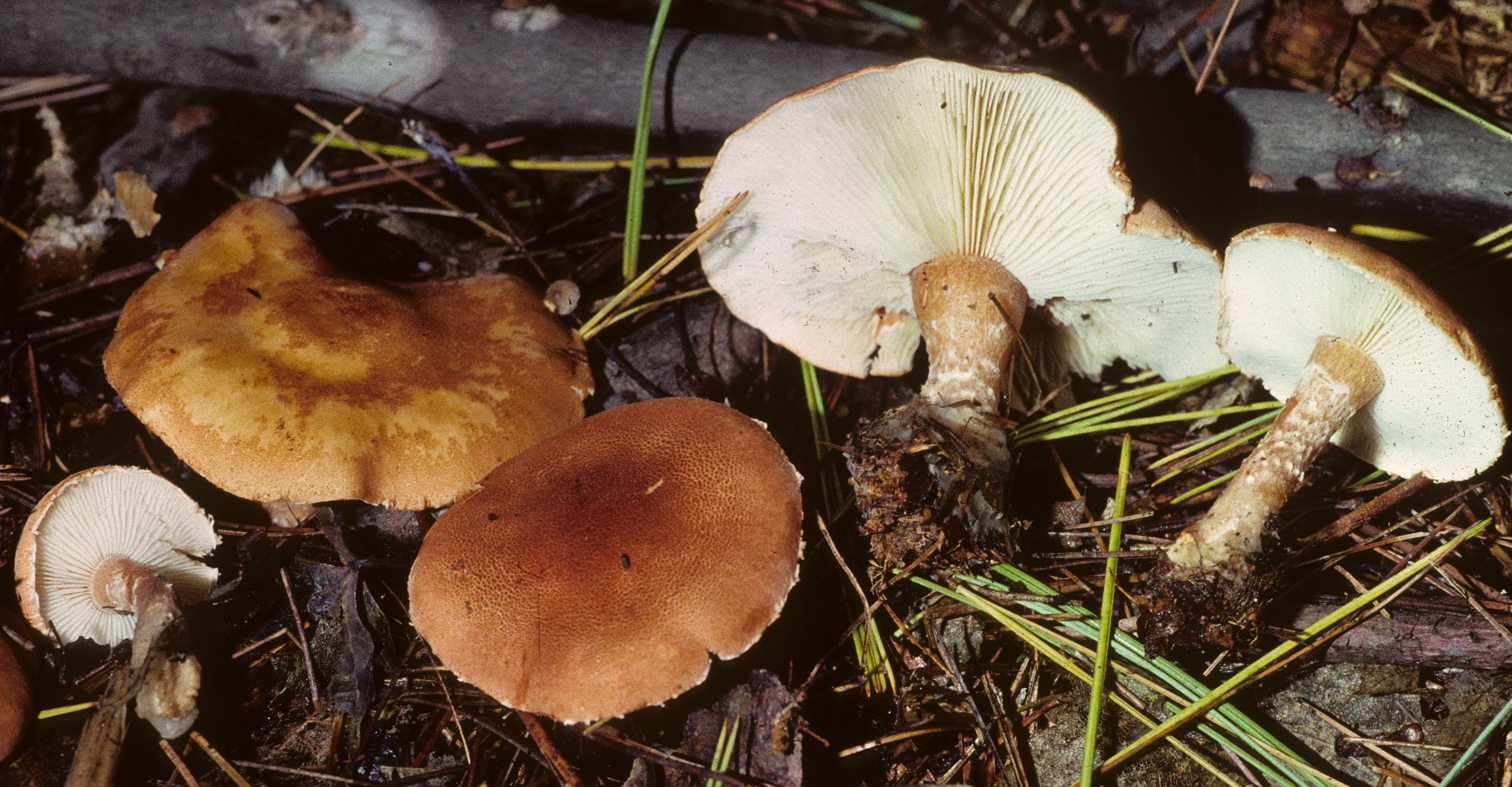
- Cystodermella cinnabarina

Scientific classification
- Domain: Eukaryota
- Kingdom: Fungi
- Division: Basidiomycota
- Class: Agaricomycetes
- Order: Agaricales
- Family: Agaricaceae
- Genus: Cystodermella; Harmaja (2002)

Type species
- Cystodermella granulosa (Batsch) Harmaja (2002)

= Cystodermella =

Genus of fungi

Cystodermella is a genus of fungi in the family Agaricaceae. The genus comprises about 12 species, noted for producing agaric fruit bodies, bearing a cap, white gills and stipe with a fine, ephemeral ring. The genus was devised by Harri Harmaja in 2002, dividing the older genus Cystoderma into three independent genera: Cystoderma, Ripartitella and Cystodermella largely on the basis of microscopic differences. Cystodermella species bear non-amyloid spores and sometimes cystidia. The spores, in contrast to Ripartitella are not echinulate.

Species of the genus have a saprotrophic mode of nutrition, and occur around the world.

== Species ==
- Cystodermella adnatifolia (Peck) Harmaja 2002
- Cystodermella ambrosii (Bres.) Harmaja 2002
- Cystodermella australis (A.H.Sm. & Singer) Vizzini 2008
- Cystodermella cinnabarina (Alb. & Schwein.) Harmaja 2002
- Cystodermella contusifolia (Pegler) Harmaja 2002
- Cystodermella cristallifera (Thoen) Harmaja 2002
- Cystodermella elegans (Beeli) Harmaja 2002
- Cystodermella freirei (Justo & M.L.Castro) Vizzini 2008
- Cystodermella granulosa (Batsch) Harmaja 2002 – United Kingdom (Note: Not edible)
- Cystodermella japonica (Thoen & Hongo) Harmaja 2002
- Cystodermella lactea Musumeci 2006
- Cystodermella myriadocystis (Heinem. & Thoen) Harmaja 2002
- Cystodermella papallactae (I.Saar & Læssøe) Vizzini 2008
- Cystodermella subpurpurea (A.H.Sm. & Singer) Harmaja 2002

== See also ==
- List of Agaricaceae genera
- List of Agaricales genera
