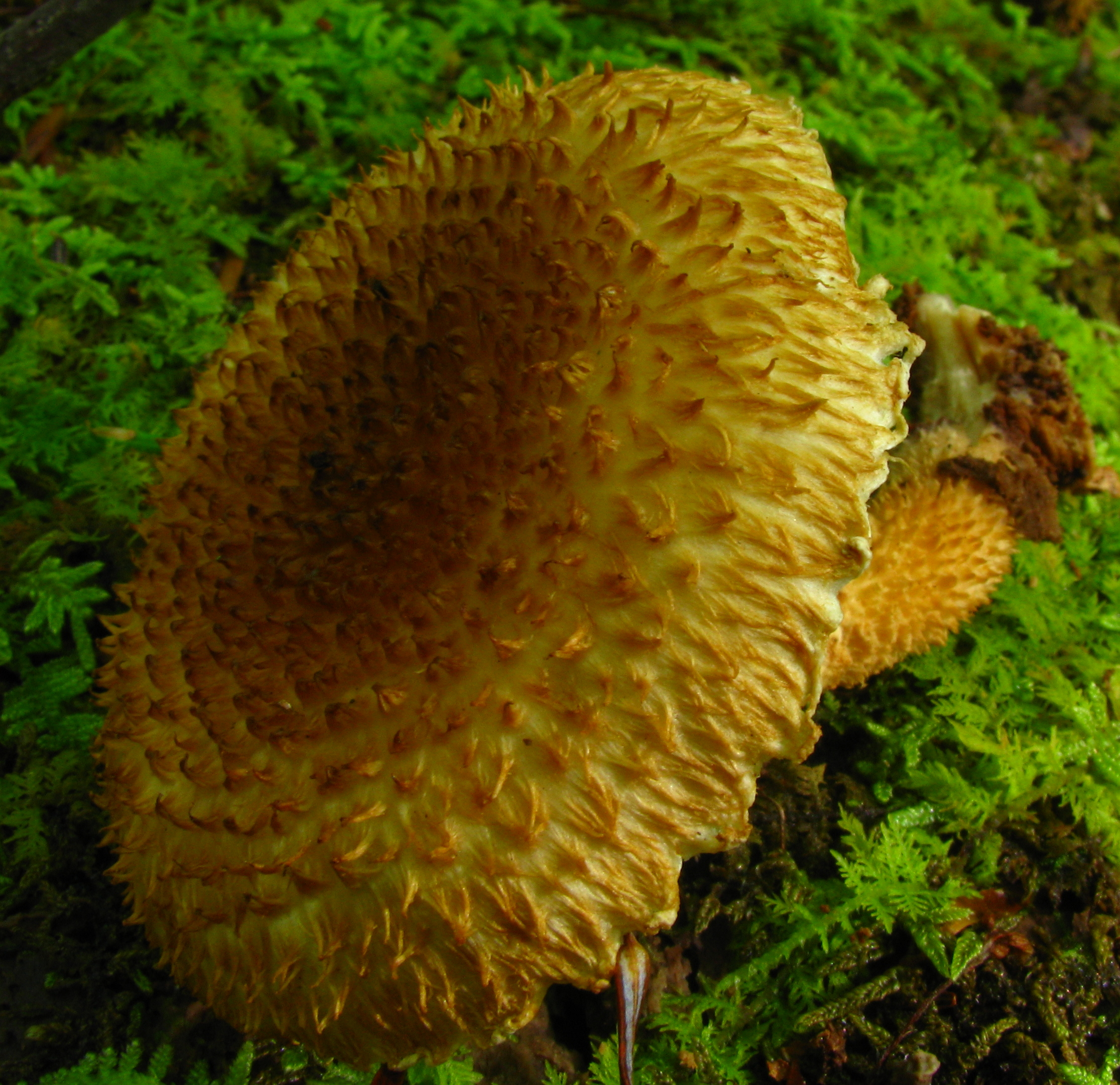
- Leucopholiota decorosa

Scientific classification
- Kingdom: Fungi
- Division: Basidiomycota
- Class: Agaricomycetes
- Order: Agaricales
- Family: Squamanitaceae
- Genus: Leucopholiota (Romagn.) O.K.Mill., T.J.Volk & Bessette

Type species
- Leucopholiota decorosa (Peck) O.K.Mill., T.J.Volk & A.E.Bessette

Species
- Leucopholiota decorosa Leucopholiota lignicola

= Leucopholiota =

Genus of fungi

Leucopholiota is a genus of fungi in the family Squamanitaceae. Basidiocarps (fruit bodies) are agarics (gilled mushrooms}. Two species are currently known, both from north temperate areas: Leucopholiota decorosa and Leucopholiota lignicola.
