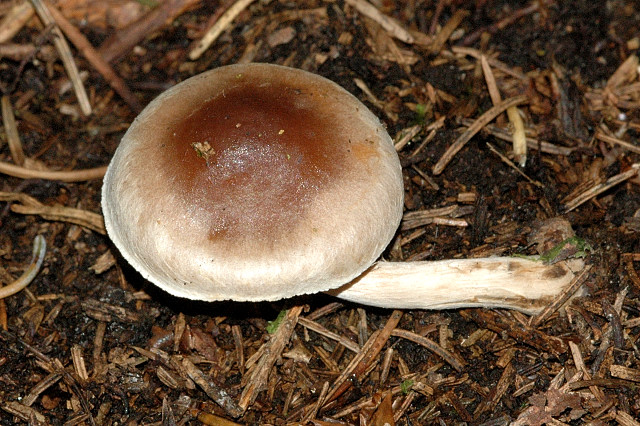

Scientific classification
- Kingdom: Fungi
- Division: Basidiomycota
- Class: Agaricomycetes
- Order: Agaricales
- Family: Hymenogastraceae
- Genus: Hebeloma
- Species: H. mesophaeum

Binomial name
- Hebeloma mesophaeum (Pers.) Quél.

= Hebeloma mesophaeum =

Species of fungus

Hebeloma mesophaeum, commonly known as the veiled hebeloma is a species of mushroom in the family Hymenogastraceae. The cap is up to 6.5 centimetres (2 1/2 in) wide, convex to umbonate, usually with a brownish center and paler margin, which may have veil remnants. The gills are close and pale then brown, the color of the spore print. The stalk is up to 8 cm long. The flesh is buff and watery, with a radishlike odor and taste.

The species can be found near trees, including conifers. Like all members of its genus, it might be poisonous and result in severe gastrointestinal upset; nevertheless, in Mexico this species is eaten and widely marketed.
