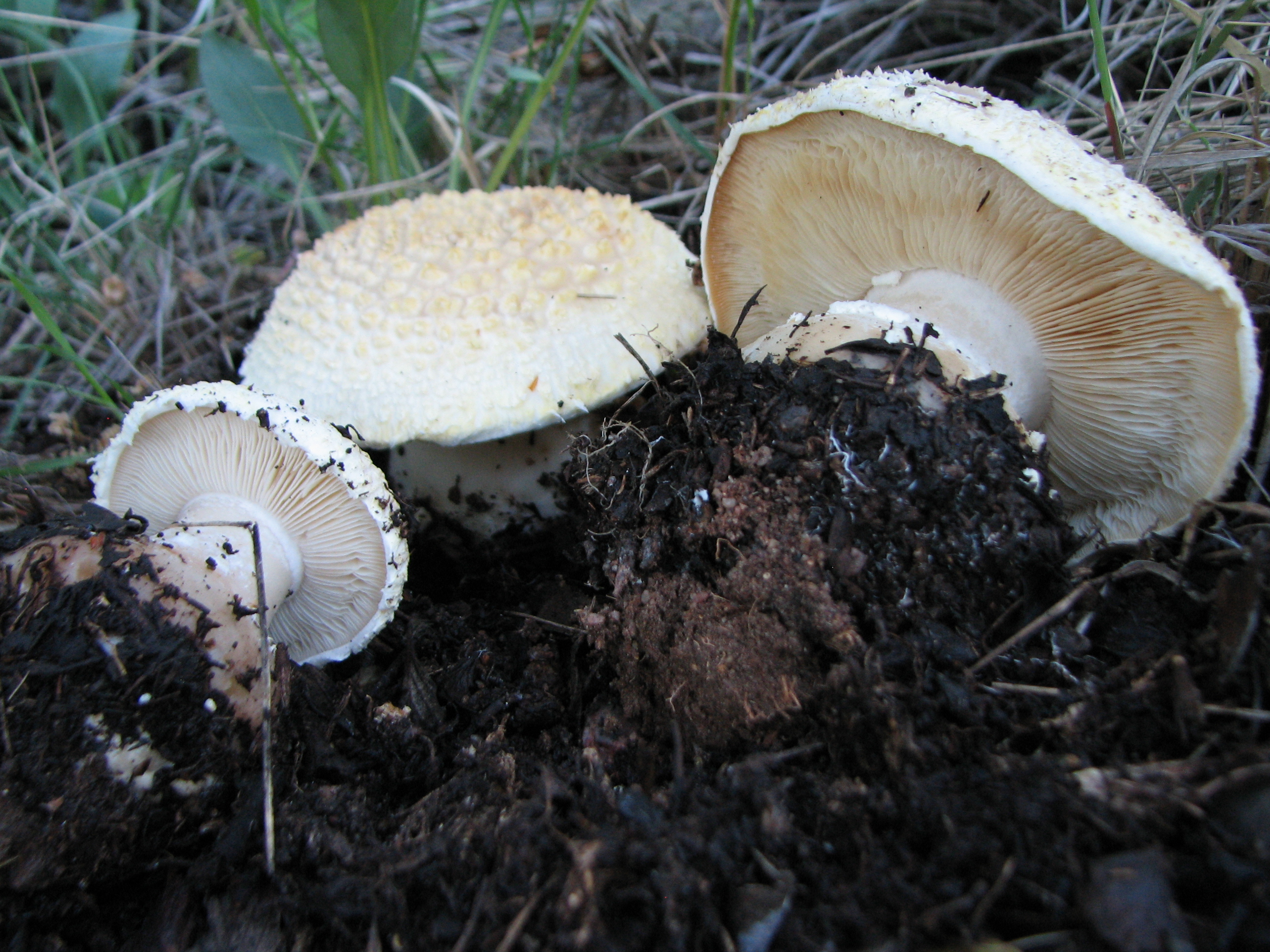
- Cercopemyces crocodilinus

Scientific classification
- Kingdom: Fungi
- Division: Basidiomycota
- Class: Agaricomycetes
- Order: Agaricales
- Family: incertae sedis
- Genus: Cercopemyces; T.J.Baroni, Kropp & V.S.Evenson (2014)

Type species
- Cercopemyces crocodilinus T.J.Baroni, Kropp & V.S.Evenson (2014)

= Cercopemyces =

Genus of fungi

Cercopemyces is a mushroom genus allied to Ripartitella and not clearly aligned with well characterized mushroom families. The genus contains four species, one known from western and another, previously known as Ripartitella ponderosa or Cystoderma ponderosa, from eastern North America, a third from Europe, and a fourth species from South America.

Ceropemyces grow in arid regions and resemble saprophytic Amanita that are sometimes classified as Saproamanita and that also grow in arid regions. The type species grows near mountain mahogany.

== Etymology ==
The name Ceropemyces was derived from the Ancient Greek name for mischievous forest creatures, the Cercopes, and -mykes (fungus).

== Species ==
- Cercopemyces crocodilinus
- Cercopemyces ponderosus
- Cercopemyces rickenii
- Cercopemyces messii

== See also ==
- List of Agaricales genera
