= Cystodermella elegans =

Scientific classification
- Domain: Eukaryota
- Kingdom: Fungi
- Division: Basidiomycota
- Class: Agaricomycetes
- Order: Agaricales
- Family: Agaricaceae
- Genus: Cystodermella
- Species: C. elegans

Binomial name
- Cystodermella elegans (Beeli) Harmaja (2002)

Synonyms
- Armillaria elegans Beeli 1927

Species of fungus

Cystodermella elegans is a fungus species in the genus Cystodermella. It was described in 1927 in Congo.
