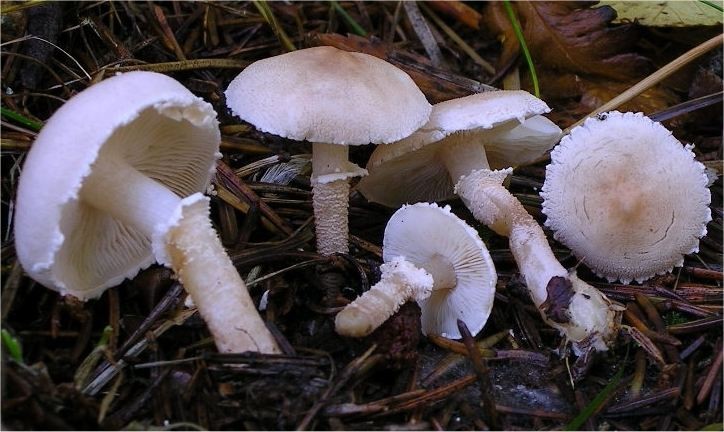

Scientific classification
- Kingdom: Fungi
- Division: Basidiomycota
- Class: Agaricomycetes
- Order: Agaricales
- Family: Squamanitaceae
- Genus: Cystoderma
- Species: C. carcharias

Binomial name
- Cystoderma carcharias (Pers.) Fayod

Synonyms
- Agaricus carcharias Agaricus granulosus var. carcharias Lepiota carcharias

= Cystoderma carcharias =

Species of fungus

Cystoderma carcharias
- Mycological characteristics
- Gills on hymenium
- Cap is convex or flat
- or adnate
- Stipe has a ring
- Spore print is white
- Ecology is saprotrophic
- Edibility is inedible

Cystoderma carcharias, is a species of agaric in the fungal family Agaricaceae. It has a widespread distribution, and has been collected in coniferous forests and grasslands in Asia, Europe, North America, and the subantarctic islands. In the field, fruit bodies are characterized by a pink cap up to 6 cm (2.4 in) broad, a well-developed ring on the stem, and an unpleasant odour.

== Taxonomy ==
The species was first described scientifically by Christian Hendrik Persoon, who named it Agaricus carcharias in 1794. Swiss mycologist Victor Fayod assigned it its current name in 1889. The specific epithet carcharias is probably derived from the Greek καρχαρός (karcharos) which means sharp, pointed or jagged. καρχαρίας (karcharias) is translated as shark.

== Description ==
The fruiting body of Cystoderma carcharias is a relatively small agaric. The fruiting body is characterised by an off-white and pale pink-tinged cap with a distinct darker central spot, and a powdery cuticle. The cap is at first convex, but with maturity becomes flat and slightly umbonate. The cap is up to 6 cm (2.4 in) in diameter and may bear a margin fringed with remnants of a partial veil. The gills are white, adnate and crowded. The stem is white and smooth above, and granular below a white, upturned, flared and persistent ring. The stem is cylindrical and up to 7 cm (2.8 in) tall. The flesh is white, firm and full throughout. Additionally, C. carcharias forma album is a form recognised as having a snow-white cap.

Under a microscope, the spores are ellipsoid, with dimensions 4–5.5 by 3–4 μm. The spores are white and amyloid. The basidia are 4-spored, club-shaped, and measure 20–25 by 4–6 μm.

The fruiting body of C. carcharias bears a characteristic strong, unpleasant odour. The odour has been described as earthy, muddy and mouldy by various authors. This has been attributed to the presence of the compound geosmin. The taste is not distinctive.

Cystoderma carcharias is a fairly common fungus distributed in Europe, North America and temperate Asia, typically occurring in coniferous forests. It has also been found on the treeless, Australian subantarctic Macquarie Island. Fruit bodies are found singly or in groups on soil among grass or moss during late summer and autumn. The fungus is an acidophilic litter saprotroph growing frequently under conifers, namely spruce.

Cystoderma carcharias accumulates cadmium in its fruiting bodies. In polluted areas, cadmium concentrations may even exceed 600 mg/kg in dry mass. Intracellular Cd accumulated in sporocarps of C. carcharias is associated with two isoforms of metallothioneins. Furthermore, C. carcharias contains numerous organoarsenic compounds from which dimethylarsinoylacetate and trimethylarsoniopropionate have been reported for the first time in the terrestrial environment.

This fungus has been deemed inedible by various authors.
