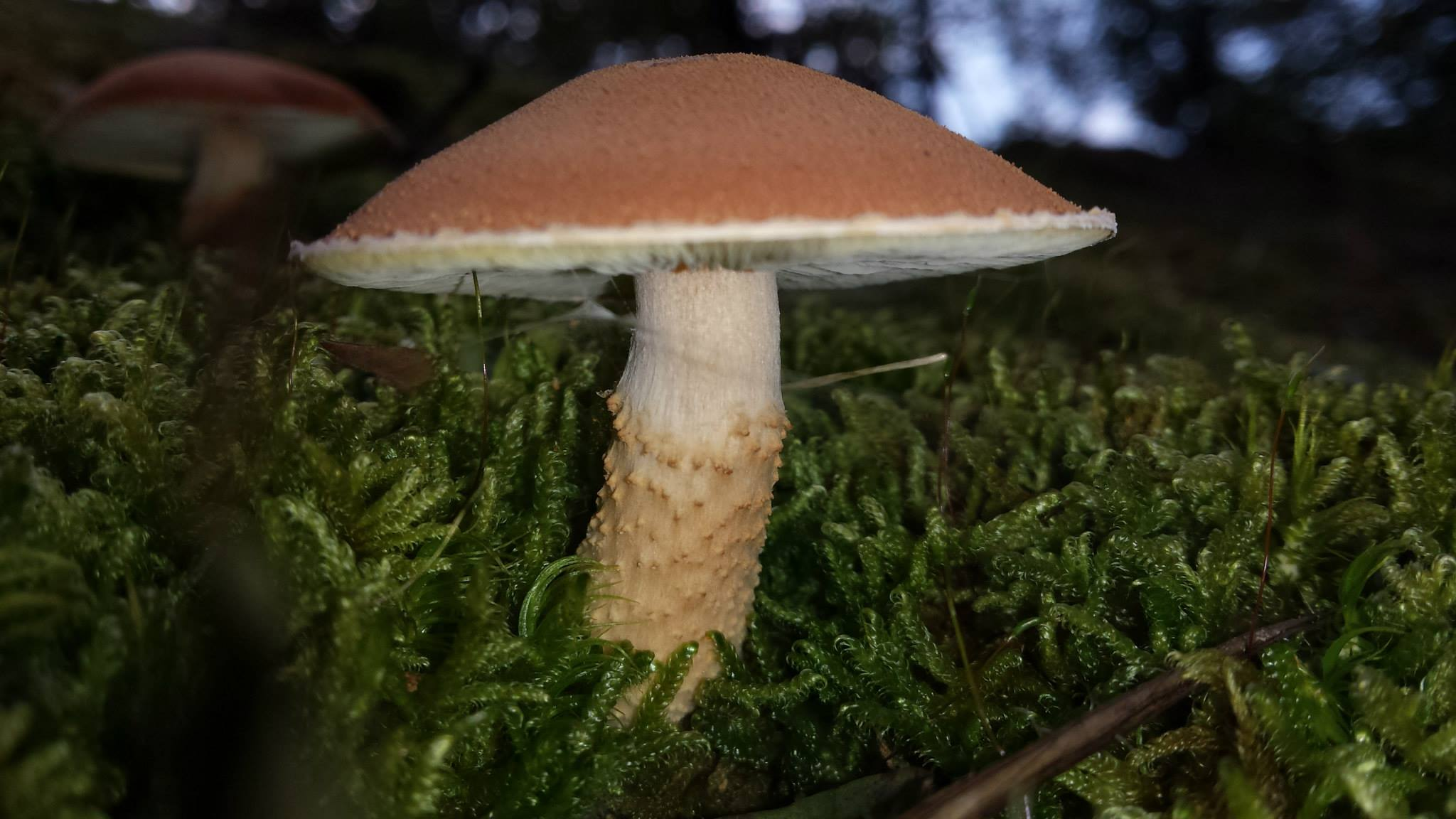

Scientific classification
- Domain: Eukaryota
- Kingdom: Fungi
- Division: Basidiomycota
- Class: Agaricomycetes
- Order: Agaricales
- Family: Agaricaceae
- Genus: Cystodermella
- Species: C. granulosa

Binomial name
- Cystodermella granulosa (Batsch) Harmaja

Synonyms
- Cystoderma granulosum

= Cystodermella granulosa =

Cystodermella granulosa Mycological characteristics
- Gills on hymenium
- Cap is convex or flat
- Hymenium is adnexed
- Stipe has a ring
- Spore print is white
- Ecology is saprotrophic
- Edibility is unknown

Cystodermella granulosa, commonly known as the brickbrown powdercap, is a species of mushroom in the genus Cystodermella.

== Description ==
Cystodermella granulosa has a reddish-brown cap that is about 2–5 cm wide, with small bits of veil tissue sometimes hanging down. The stipe is about 3-7.5 cm tall and about 0.3-0.6 cm wide. It is also covered in scales.

The spore print of this mushroom is white.
