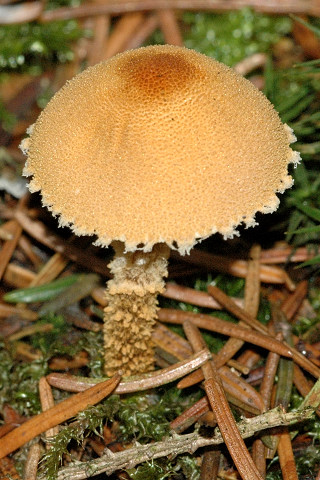
- Cystoderma amianthinum

Scientific classification
- Kingdom: Fungi
- Division: Basidiomycota
- Class: Agaricomycetes
- Order: Agaricales
- Family: Squamanitaceae
- Genus: Cystoderma; Fayod

Type species
- Agaricus amianthinum (Scop.) Fayod

= Cystoderma =

Genus of fungi

Cystoderma is a genus of fungi in the family Agaricaceae or Cystodermataceae. Its family position is in doubt and the family "Cystodermataceae" and tribe "Cystodermateae" have been proposed to include this group following recent molecular work.

Previously Cystoderma comprised a wider range of species but in 2002 Harmaja separated some of them off into the new genus Cystodermella (for instance Cystoderma cinnabarinum, C. elegans and C. granulosum). The separation was made largely on the basis that the spores in the new genus were not at all amyloid. Those remaining in Cystoderma have weakly to strongly amyloid spores, tend to have a persistent ring and to have arthroconidia. DNA analysis supports the division into the two groups, but further investigation has shown that none of the morphological characteristics distinguish between them in a consistent clear-cut way.

The name probably comes from the Greek kýstis meaning pouch and derma meaning skin.

== List of species ==
The following species are recognised in the genus Cystoderma:

- Cystoderma amianthinum (Scop.) Fayod
- Cystoderma andinum I. Saar & Læssøe
- Cystoderma arcticum Harmaja
- Cystoderma aureolum (Raithelh.) Raithelh.
- Cystoderma austrofallax Singer
- Cystoderma bonnardiae Thoen
- Cystoderma carcharias (Pers.) Fayod
- Cystoderma castellanum Blanco-Dios
- Cystoderma caucasicum Singer
- Cystoderma chocoanum Franco-Mol.
- Cystoderma clastotrichum (G. Stev.) E. Horak
- Cystoderma fallax A.H. Sm. & Singer
- Cystoderma ferruginosum Pegler
- Cystoderma fulvolateritium (Raithelh.) Raithelh.
- Cystoderma fumosopurpureum (Lasch) Fayod
- Cystoderma granosum (Morgan) A.H. Sm. & Singer
- Cystoderma granuliferum (Bas & Læssøe) I. Saar
- Cystoderma granulosocinnabarinum Singer
- Cystoderma gruberianum A.H. Sm.
- Cystoderma haematites (Sacc.) Konrad & Maubl.
- Cystoderma intermedium Harmaja
- Cystoderma japonicum Thoen & Hongo
- Cystoderma jasonis (Cooke & Massee) Harmaja
- Cystoderma jeoliense Dhanch., J.C. Bhatt & S.K. Pant
- Cystoderma kuehneri Singer
- Cystoderma lilaceum R.L. Zhao, M.Q. He & J.X. Li
- Cystoderma lilacipes Harmaja
- Cystoderma muscicola (Cleland) Grgur.
- Cystoderma neoamianthinum Hongo
- Cystoderma niveum Harmaja
- Cystoderma ochracea Fayod
- Cystoderma ossaeiformisporum (S. Imai) S. Ito
- Cystoderma pseudoamianthinum R.L. Zhao, M.Q. He & J.X. Li
- Cystoderma pulveraceum A.H. Sm. & Singer
- Cystoderma rugosolateritium R.L. Zhao, M.Q. He & J.X. Li
- Cystoderma saarenoksae Harmaja
- Cystoderma simulatum P.D. Orton
- Cystoderma subglobisporum R.L. Zhao, M.Q. He & J.X. Li
- Cystoderma subornatum Raithelh.
- Cystoderma subvinaceum A.H. Sm.
- Cystoderma superbum Huijsman
- Cystoderma texense Thiers
- Cystoderma tricholomoides Heinem. & Thoen
- Cystoderma tuomikoskii Harmaja
