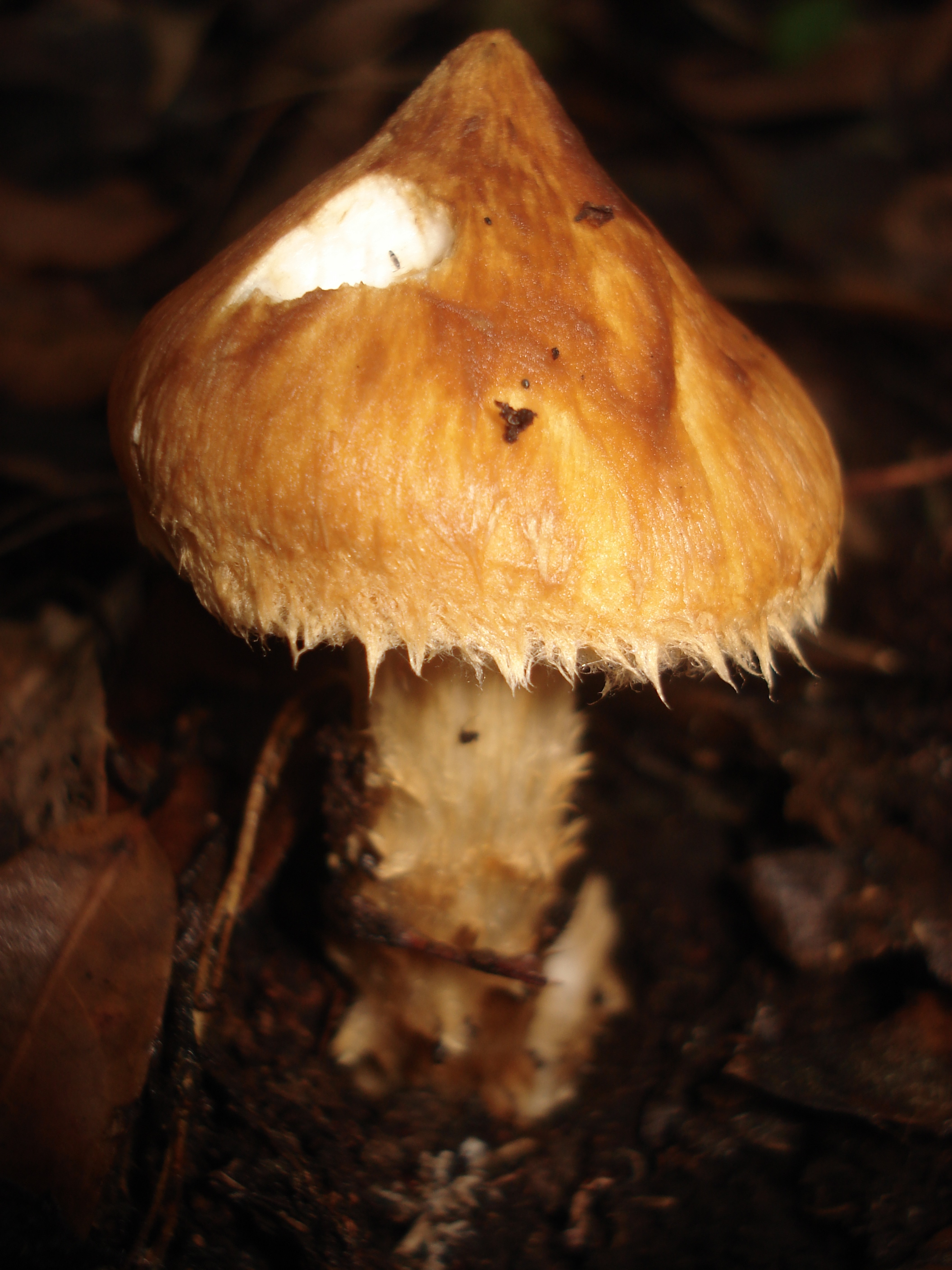
- Squamanita umbonata

Scientific classification
- Kingdom: Fungi
- Division: Basidiomycota
- Class: Agaricomycetes
- Order: Agaricales
- Family: Squamanitaceae
- Genus: Squamanita; Imbach (1946)

Type species
- Squamanita schreieri Imbach (1946)

Species
- Squamanita cameroonensis; Squamanita citricolor; Squamanita guyanensis; Squamanita imbachii; Squamanita magnisquarrulosa; Squamanita mira; Squamanita orientalis; Squamanita schreieri; Squamanita sororcula; Squamanita squarrulosa; Squamanita sumstinei; Squamanita umbonata; Squamanita volvatiparva

Synonyms
- Squamamanita Imbach (1942) nom. invalid.

= Squamanita =

Genus of fungi

Squamanita is a genus of parasitic fungi in the family Squamanitaceae. Basidiocarps (fruit bodies) superficially resemble normal agarics (gilled mushrooms) but emerge from parasitized fruit bodies of deformed host agarics.

== Taxonomy ==
The genus was created in 1946 by Swiss mycologist Emil Imbach to accommodate an unusual agaric species, Squamanita schreieri, which L. Schreier had earlier described and illustrated as "Tricholoma X". In 1965 Dutch mycologist Cornelis Bas expanded the genus to five species, all of which were characterized by arising from "sclerotial bodies". The possibility that Squamanita might be parasitic on other agarics (the remains of which formed the "sclerotial bodies") was noted by British mycologist Derek Reid in 1983. The discovery of a host fruit body that formed its own pileus together with three Squamanita pilei confirmed the parasitic nature of the genus, a discovery subsequently featured in Nature under the title 'Mycological mystery tour'.

Molecular research, based on cladistic analysis of DNA sequences, has confirmed the parasitism of Squamanita, but has also shown that species belong to two genera: Squamanita sensu stricto and Dissoderma. A number of species previously referred to Squamanita have accordingly been transferred to Dissoderma.

== See also ==
- List of Agaricales genera
