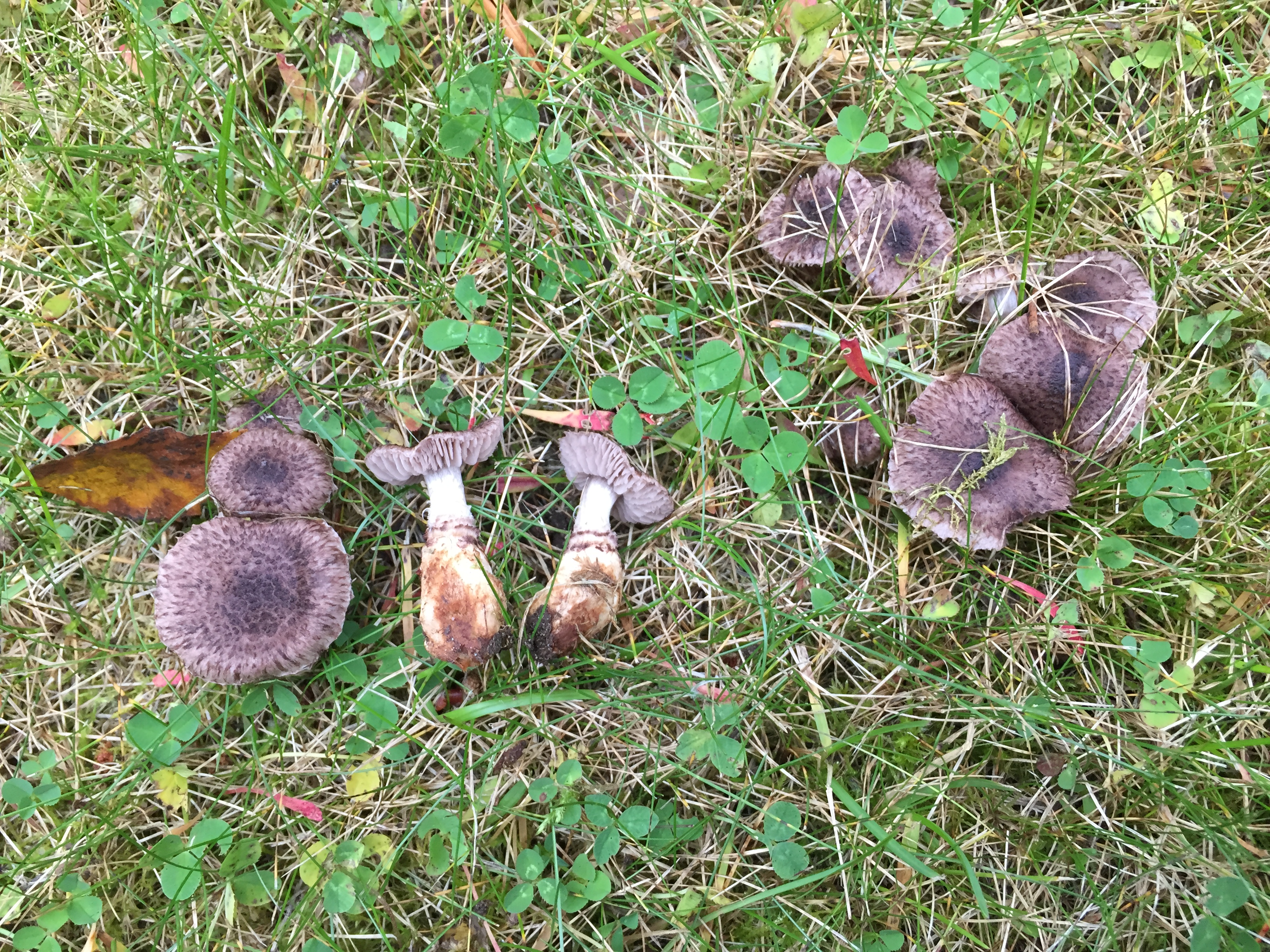
- Dissoderma odoratum

Scientific classification
- Kingdom: Fungi
- Division: Basidiomycota
- Class: Agaricomycetes
- Order: Agaricales
- Family: Squamanitaceae; Jülich (1981)

Type genus
- Squamanita Imbach (1946)

Genera
- Cystoderma; Dissoderma; Floccularia; Leucopholiota; Phaeolepiota; Squamanita

Synonyms
- Cystodermataceae Locq. (1984) nom inval.

= Squamanitaceae =

Family of fungi

The Squamanitaceae are a family of fungi in the order Agaricales. All species in the family are agarics (gilled mushrooms). Species in two genera, Dissoderma and Squamanita, are parasitic on other agarics. Members of the Squamanitaceae are found worldwide.

== Taxonomy ==
The family was first proposed in 1981 by Dutch mycologist Walter Jülich. Its current circumscription is the result of molecular research, based on cladistic analysis of DNA sequences.

== Gallery ==
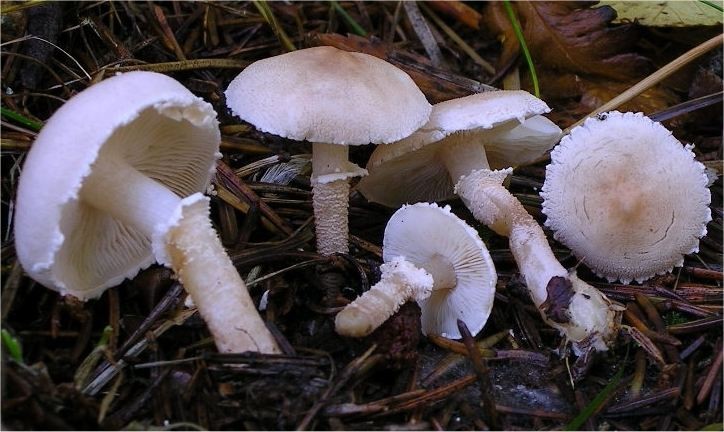
Cystoderma carcharias

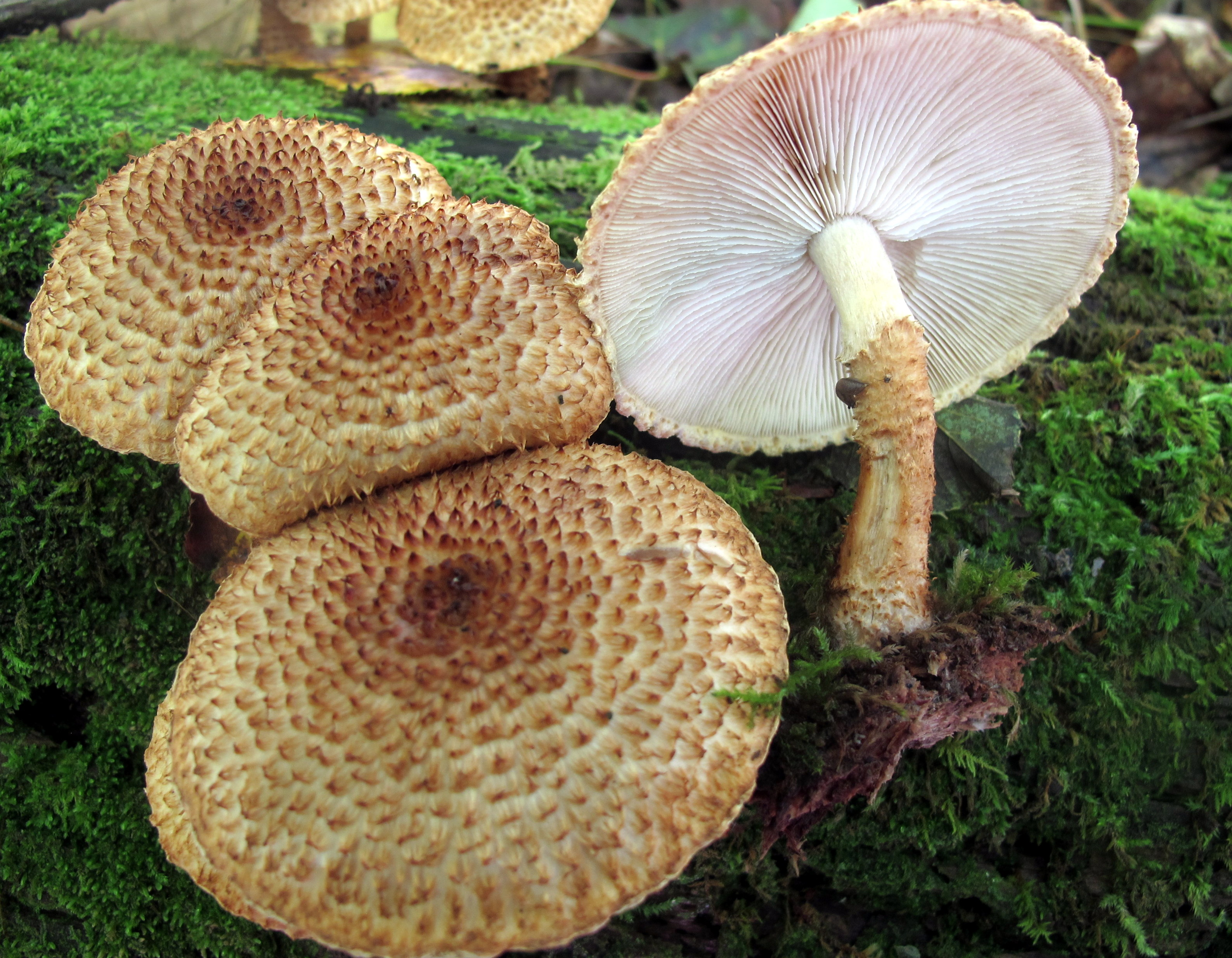
Leucopholiota decorosa

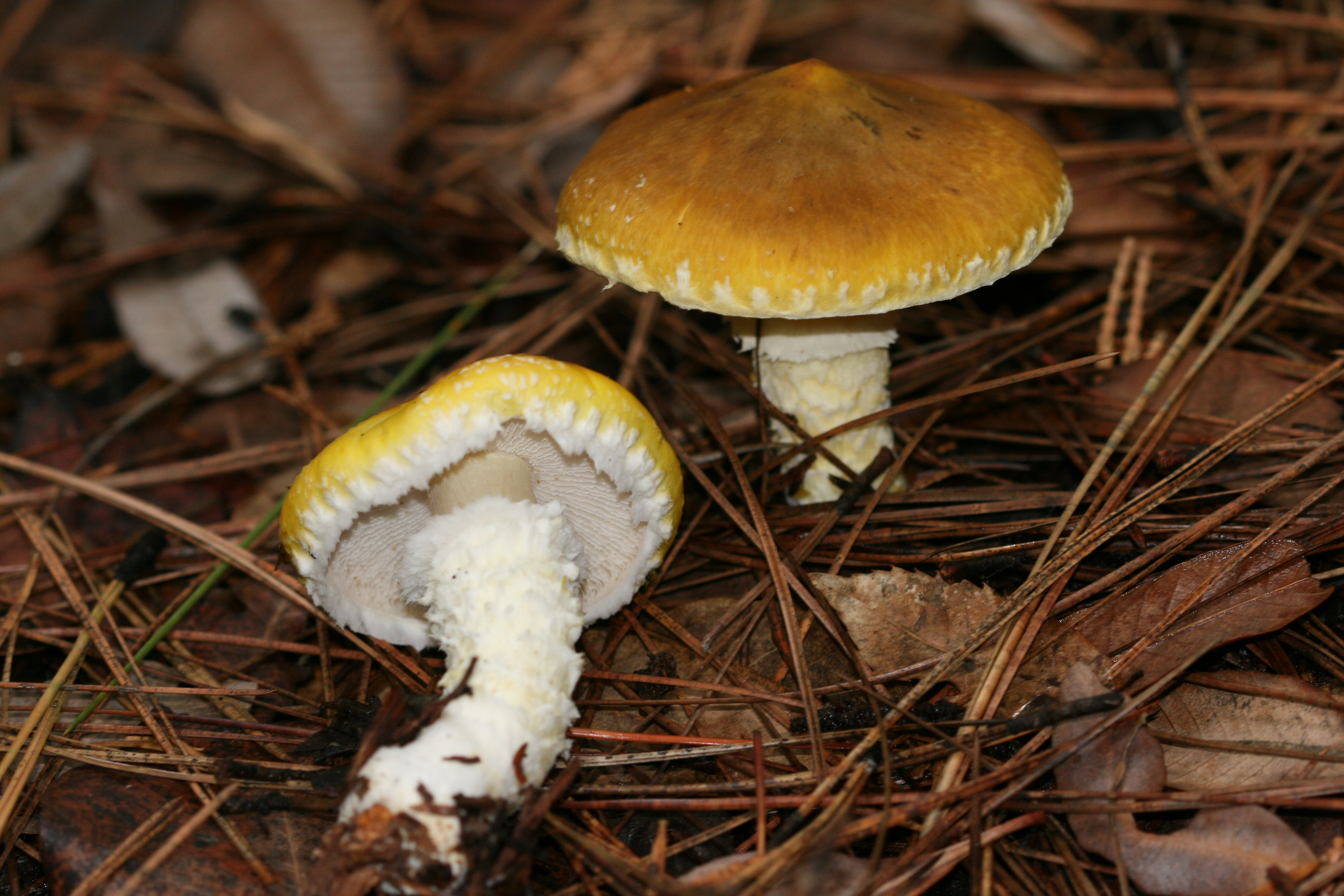
Floccularia albolanaripes

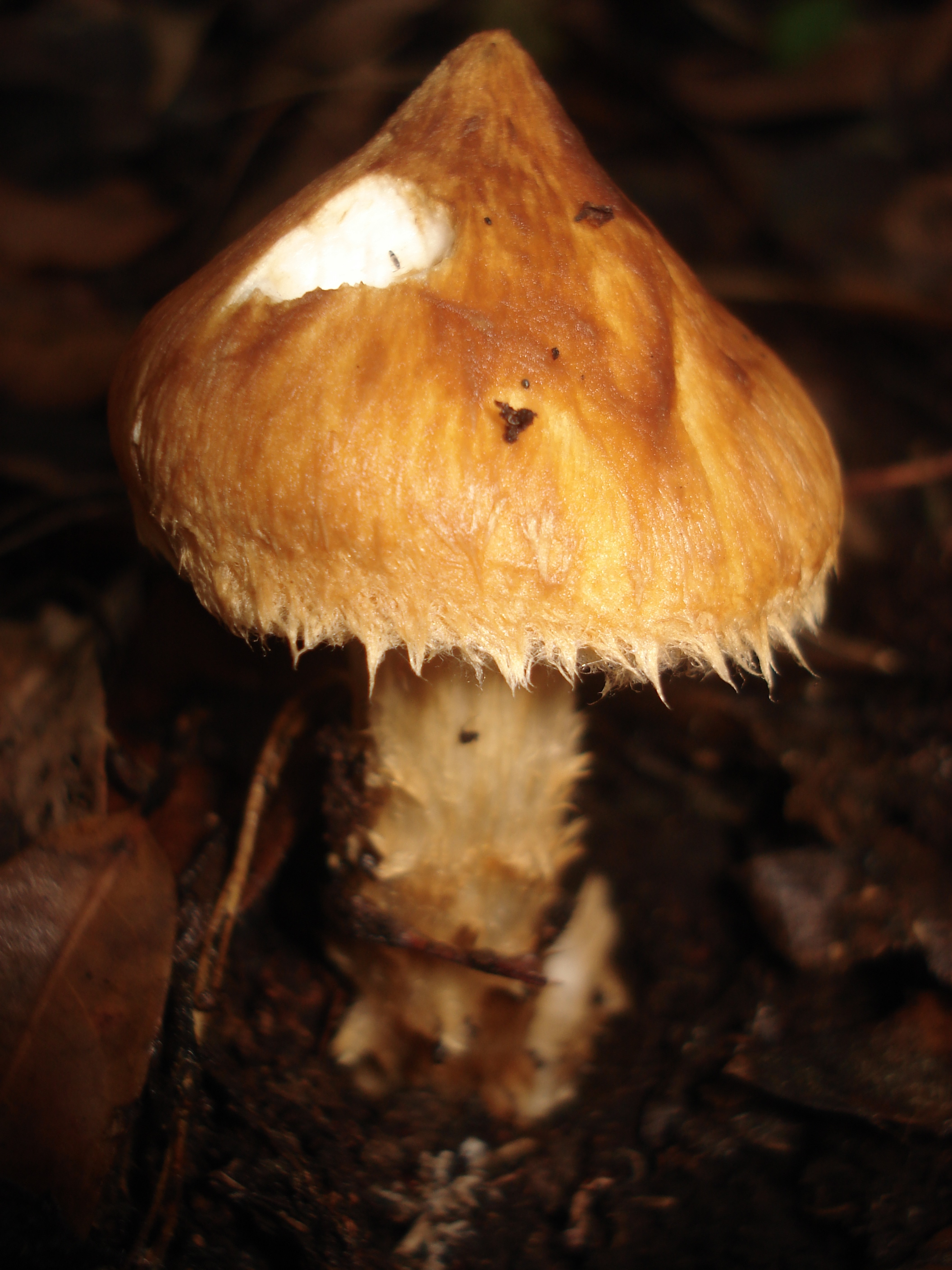
Squamanita umbonata

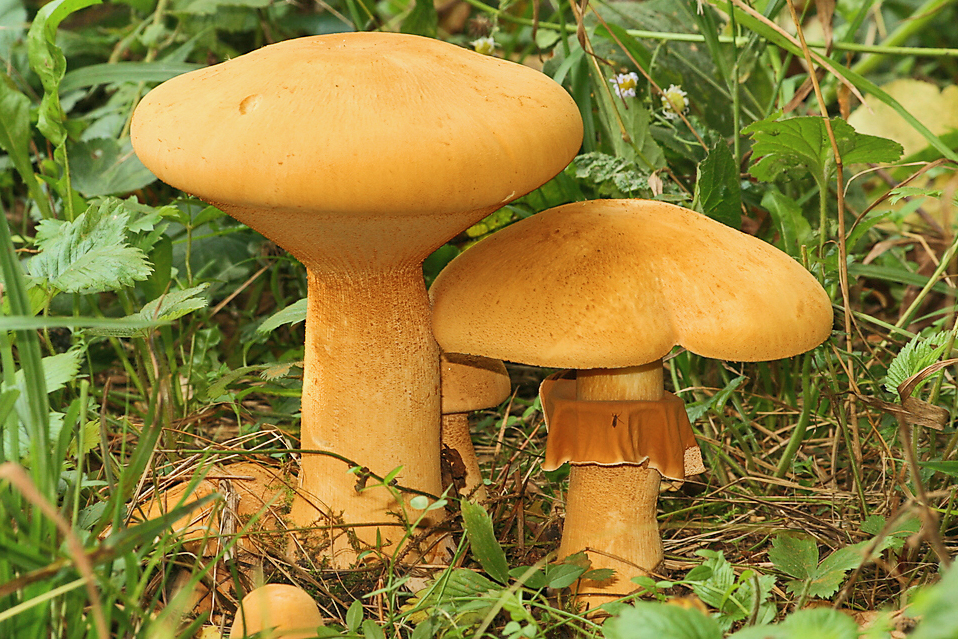
Phaeolepiota aurea
