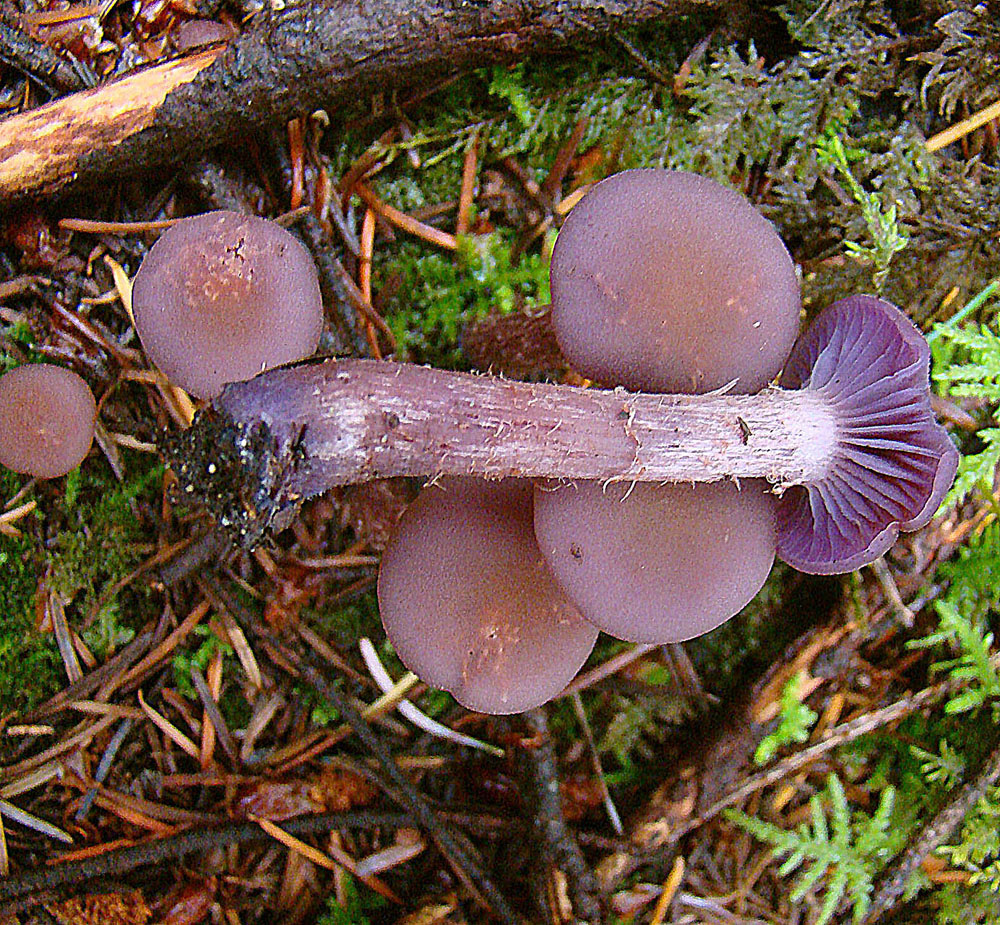

Scientific classification
- Kingdom: Fungi
- Division: Basidiomycota
- Class: Agaricomycetes
- Order: Agaricales
- Family: Hydnangiaceae
- Genus: Laccaria
- Species: L. amethysteo-occidentalis

Binomial name
- Laccaria amethysteo-occidentalis Mueller, 1984

Synonyms
- Laccaria laccata var. amethysteo-occidentalis (Cooke) Rea; Laccaria amethystea-occidentalis

= Laccaria amethysteo-occidentalis =

Laccaria amethysteo-occidentalis
- Mycological characteristics
- Gills on hymenium
- Cap is convex or depressed
- Hymenium is adnate or decurrent
- Stipe is bare
- Spore print is white
- Ecology is mycorrhizal
- Edibility is edible

Laccaria amethysteo-occidentalis is a mushroom found under conifers, usually pine, growing alone, scattered or gregariously in western North America.

== Description ==
The mushroom is entirely purple. The cap is 1–7 centimetres (1/2–2 3/4 in) in width; broad, convex to flat, often depressed, occasionally becoming slightly translucent-striated when fading, finely fibrillose, hygrophanous, fading to violet; margin rolled inward, later becoming flat; context thin and lighter grayish purple in color.

The gills are purple, thick and distant. The stem is up to 14 cm (5 1/2 in) long, fibrous, with a whitish mycelium near the base.

The spores are 7.5–10.5 x 7–16 μm, subglobose or broadly elliptical. The spore print is white.

Basidia are 34–56.5 × 9.7–14.7 μm, clavate, elongate, hyaline. Pleurocystidia absent. Cheilocystidia are 36.5–66.5 × 12–18.4 μm, subclavate to clavate, thin-walled, hyaline, often very abundant, extending well beyond basidia.

=== Similar species ===
This species is similar to L. amethystina but differs by occurring in hardwood forest in eastern North America, rather than coniferous forest; having a smaller sporocarp; and being a lighter purple color. L. bicolor is smaller and less purplish; L. laccata has whitish mycelium at its base. Cortinarius violaceus is darker and has a less fibrillose stipe. Pseudoomphalina cokeri is also similar.

== Distribution and habitat ==
It can be found on the ground near the North American West Coast from October to February.

== Uses ==
The mushroom is edible, with good texture, but not much flavor.
