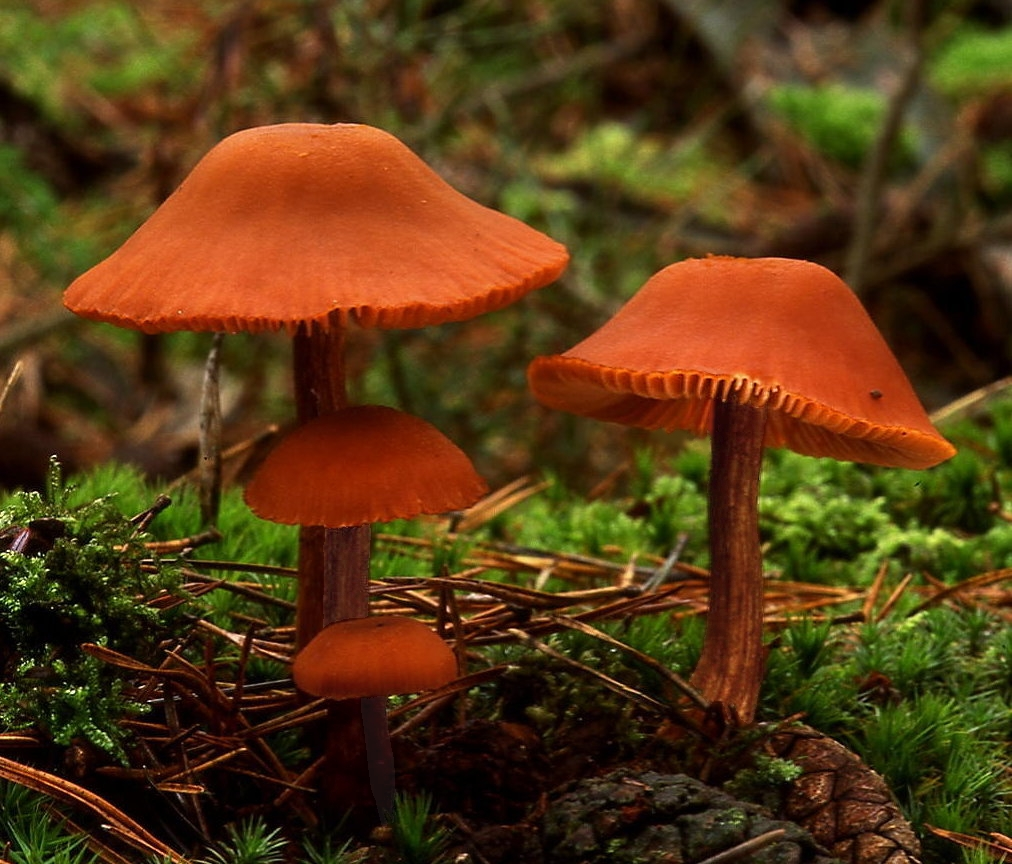

Scientific classification
- Kingdom: Fungi
- Division: Basidiomycota
- Class: Agaricomycetes
- Order: Agaricales
- Family: Hydnangiaceae
- Genus: Laccaria
- Species: L. laccata

Binomial name
- Laccaria laccata (Scop.) Cooke

= Laccaria laccata =

Laccaria laccata
- Mycological characteristics
- Gills on hymenium
- Cap is convex or flat
- Hymenium is adnate or decurrent
- Stipe is bare
- Spore print is white
- Ecology is mycorrhizal
- Edibility is edible but not recommended

Laccaria laccata, commonly known as the deceiver, lackluster laccaria, or waxy laccaria, is a species of fungus. It is a small but highly variable mushroom (hence 'deceiver'), and can look quite washed out, colorless and drab, but when younger it often assumes red, pinkish brown, and orange tones. It has white spores.

Found throughout North America and Europe, the species is often considered by mushroom collectors to be a 'mushroom weed' because of its abundance and plain stature. The cap is edible.

== Taxonomy ==
The deceiver was first described by Tyrolian naturalist Giovanni Antonio Scopoli in 1772 as Agaricus laccatus, before being given its current binomial name by Mordecai Cubitt Cooke in 1884. The specific epithet is derived from the Latin adjective laccatus 'varnished' or 'shining'. Clitocybe laccata is an old alternative name. Var. pallidifolia, described by Charles Horton Peck, is the most common variety found in North America.

It is the type species of the cosmopolitan mushroom genus Laccaria; where their relations lie among the gilled mushrooms is unclear, but they are currently classified in the family Hydnangiaceae.

The deceiver gets its common name from its variable appearance. Other names include lacklustre laccaria, and, by the Zapotec people, Beshia ladhi biinii (also the name of other members of Laccaria).

== Description ==
The deceiver is a small mushroom with a cap measuring 2–6 cm (1–2.5 in) in diameter, convex when young and later flattening or even depressed in the center. It can be various shades of salmon pink, brick-red, or shades of orange or brown when moist or young, and duller and paler when dry. The fibrous stipe is 2–10 cm (1–4 in) high and 3–10 mm (0–0.5 in) wide. The irregular gills are widely spaced and decurrent or adnexed, and of similar color to the cap, though whiten with spores as the mushroom matures. The spore print is white, and the round spiny spores are 7–10 μm in diameter. The flesh is thin and has little taste.

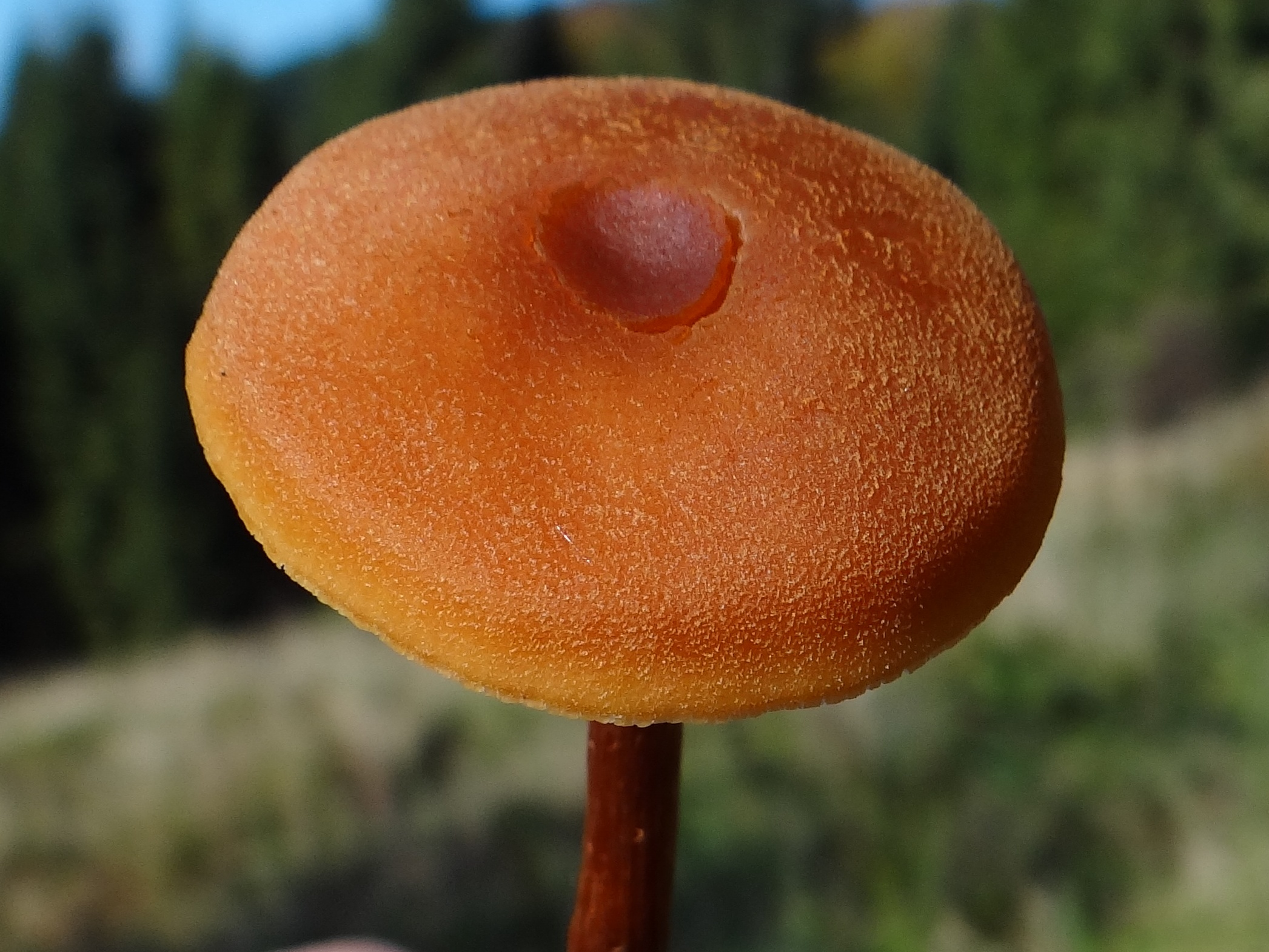
Cap

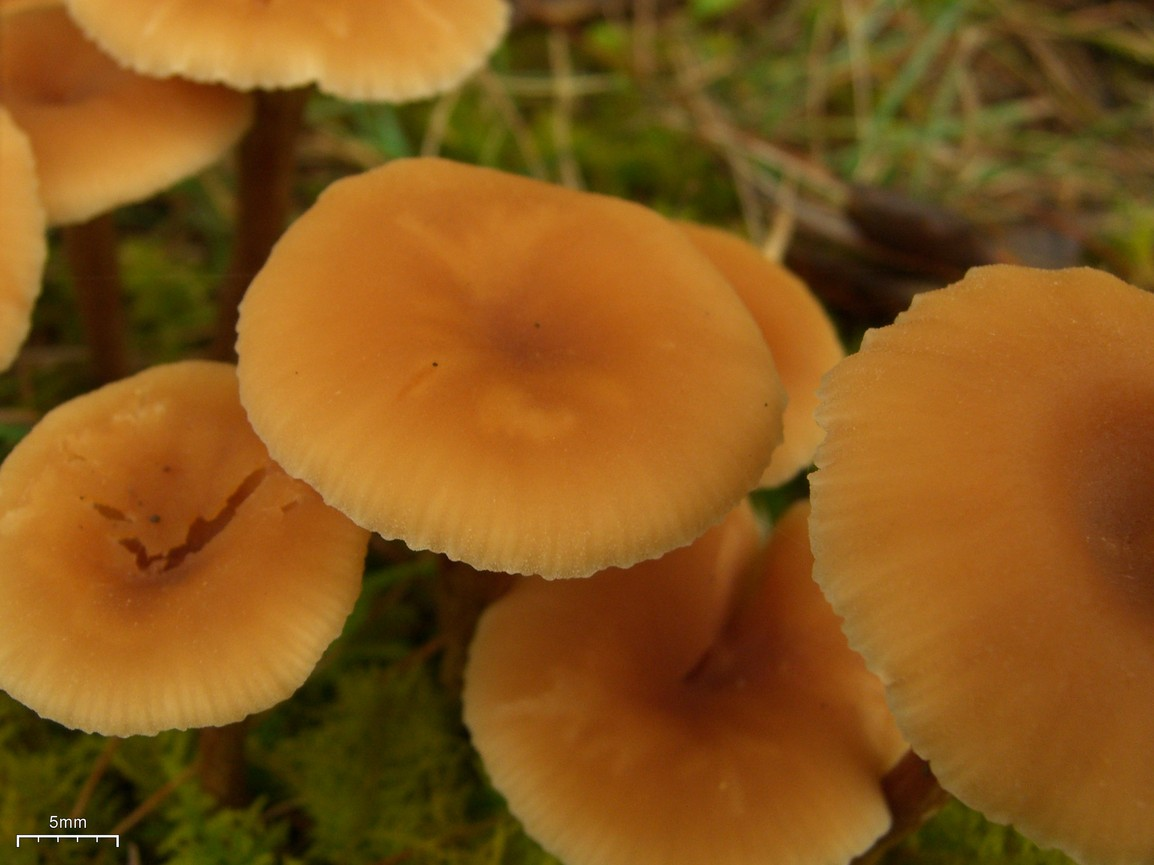
Caps

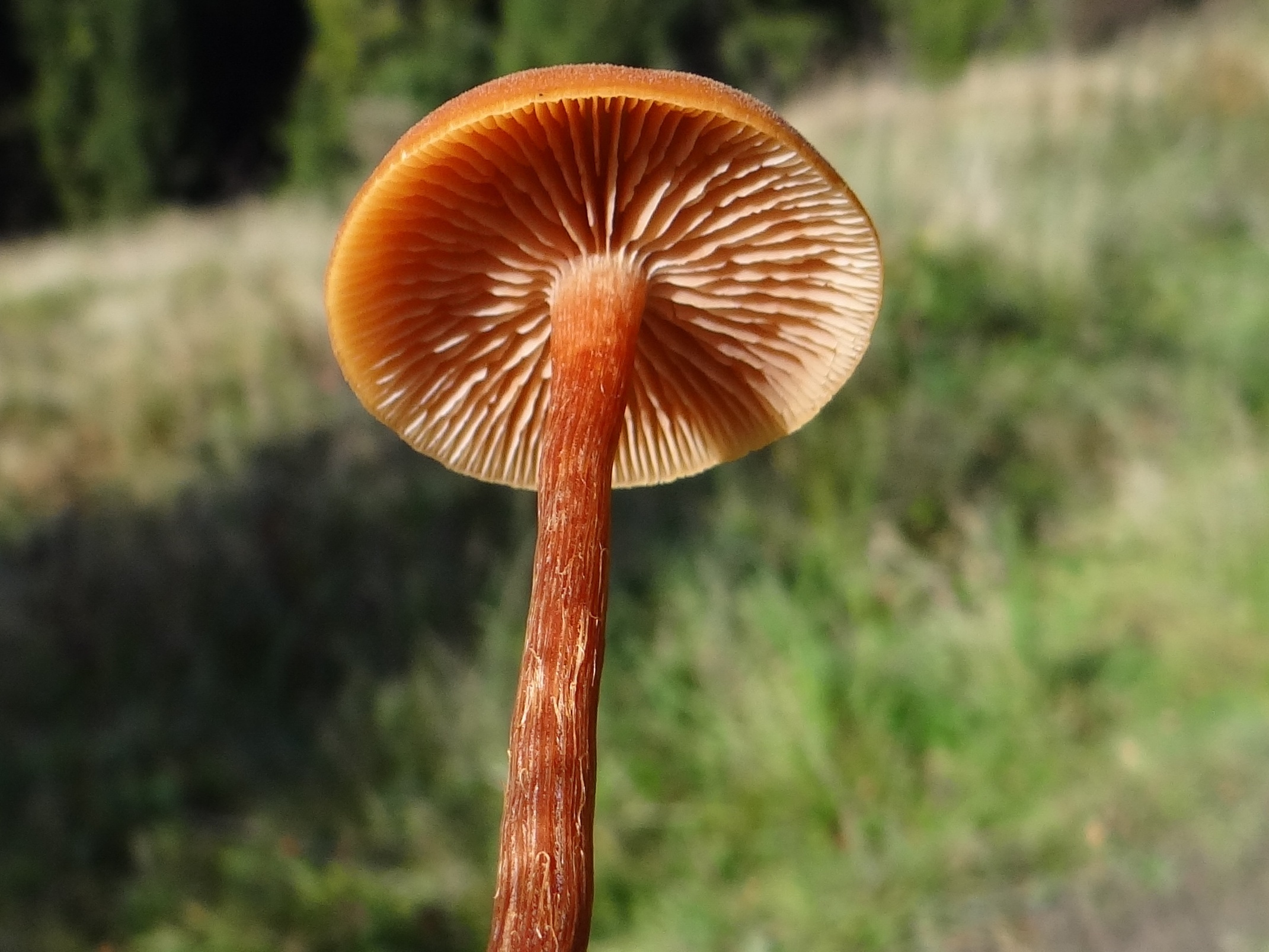
Gills and stipe

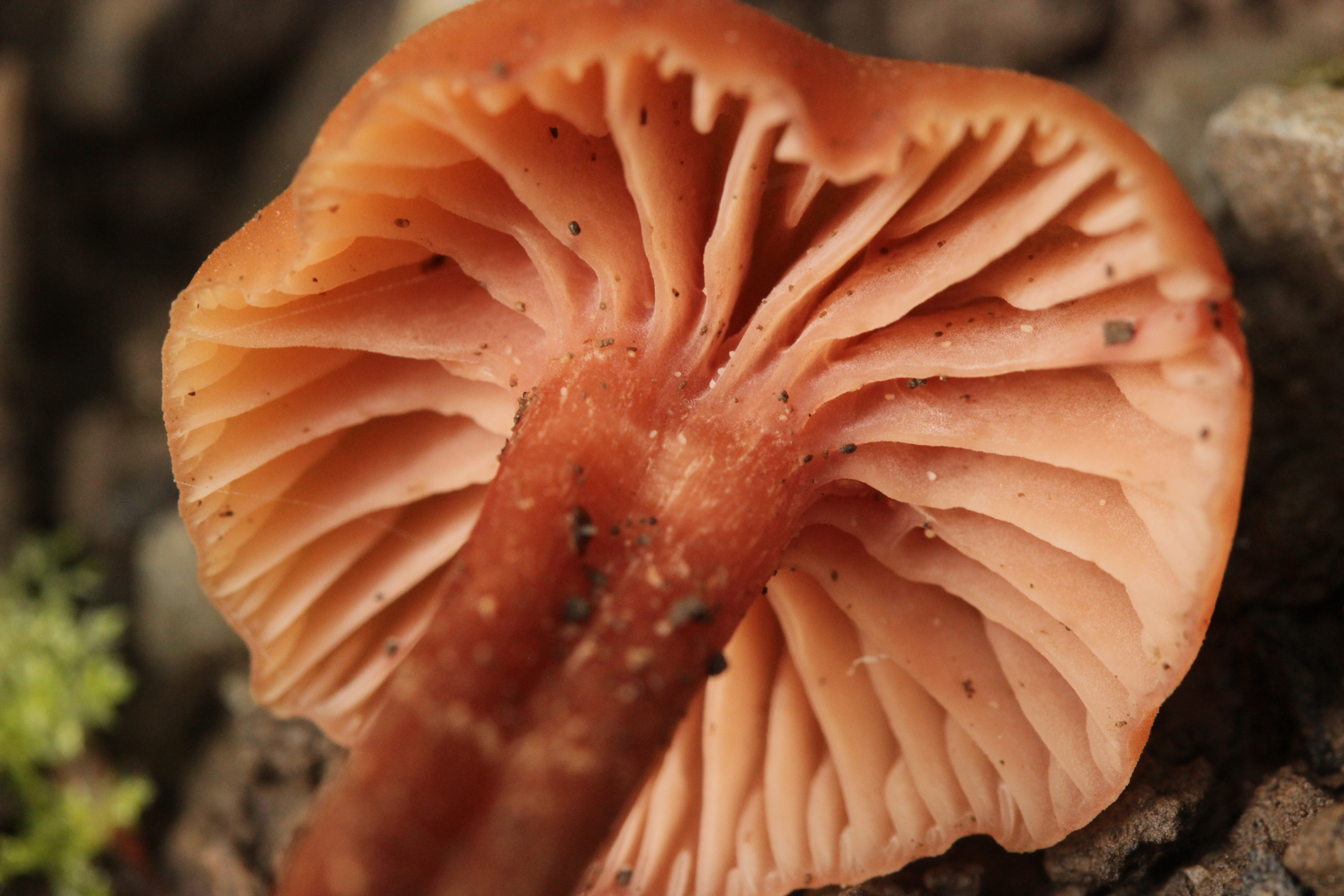
Gills

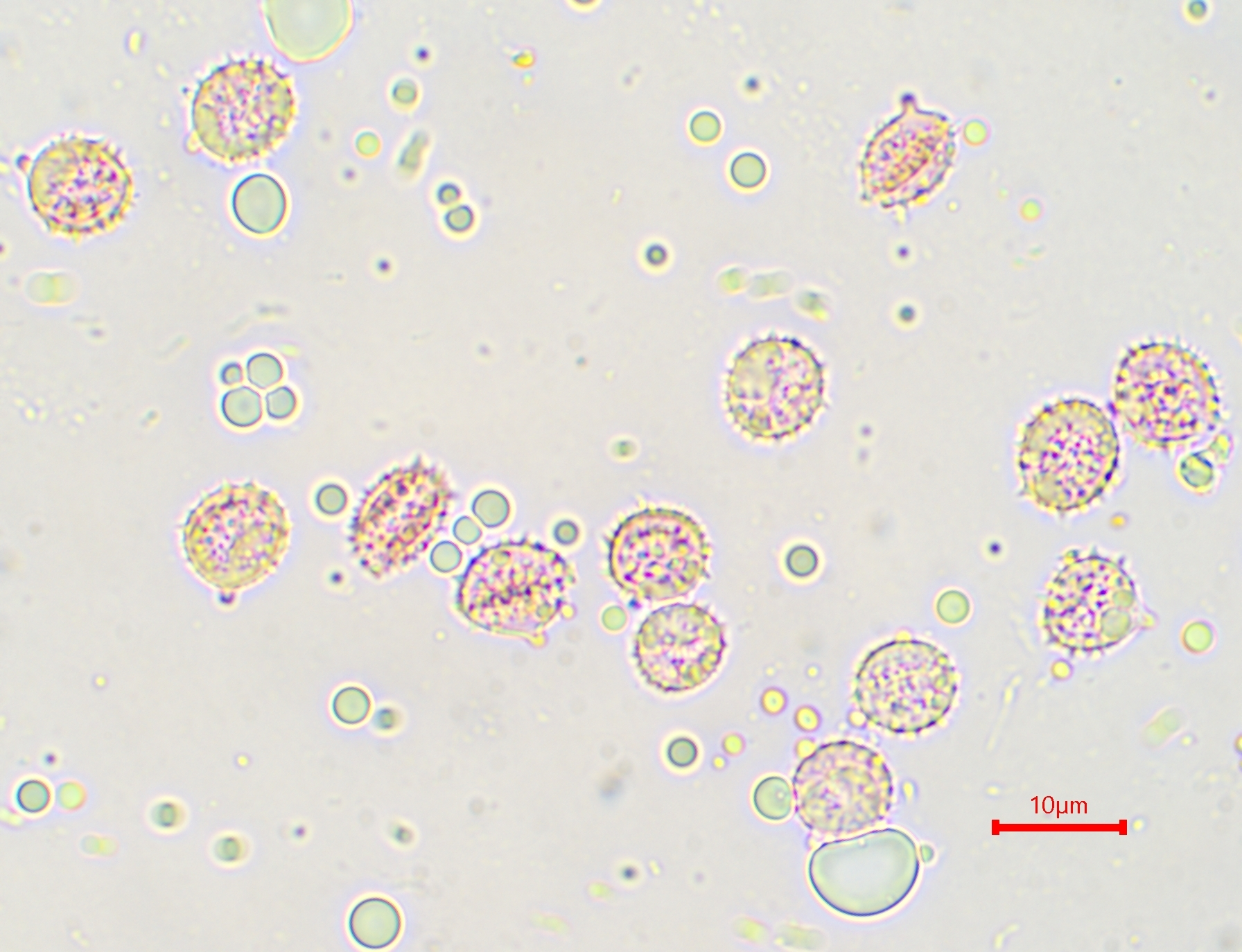
Spores

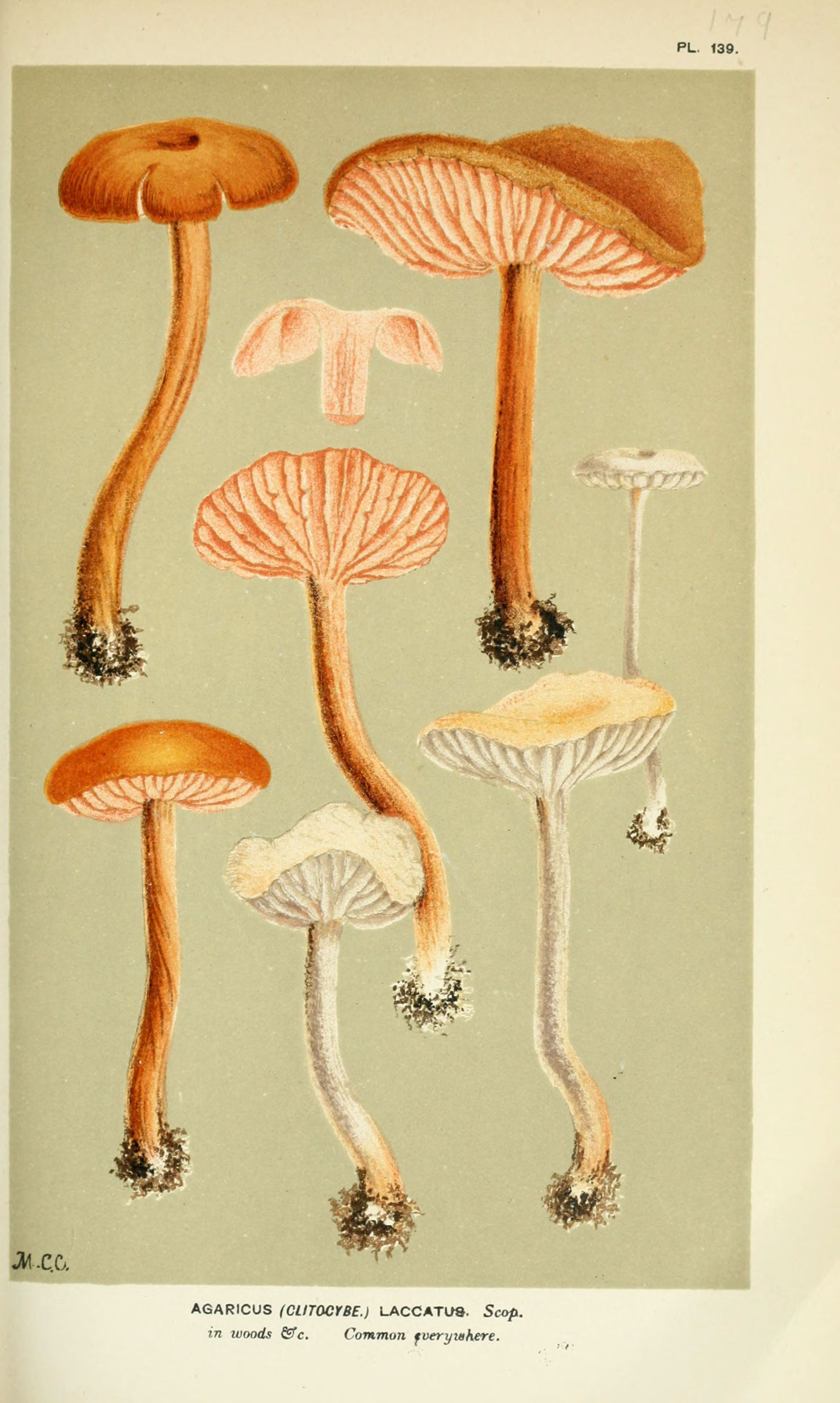
Illustration

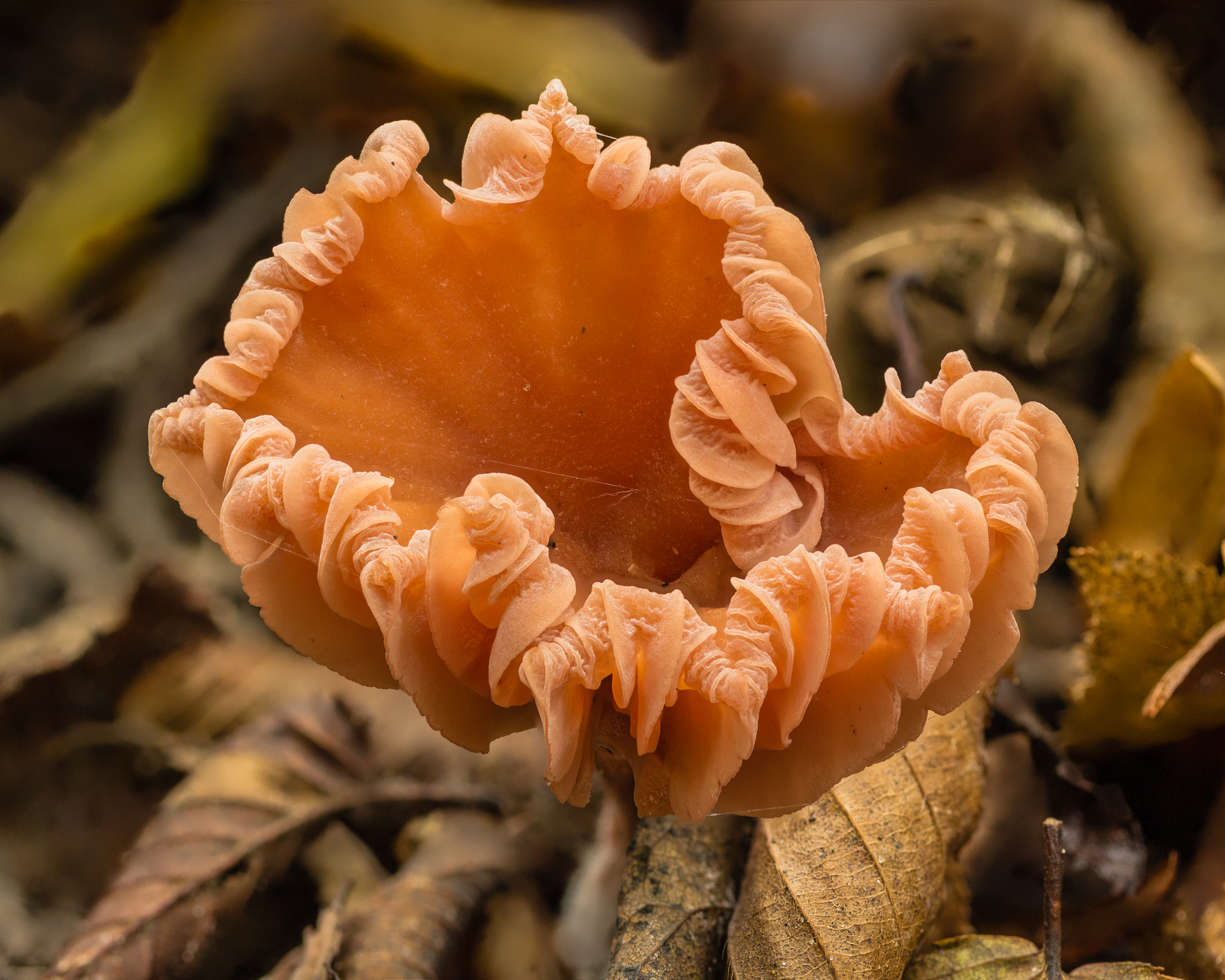
Cap with curled gills

=== Similar species ===
Formerly considered a subspecies by French mycologist René Maire, the close deceiver (L. proxima) is a European relative with a fine scaly cap and found in wetter habitats. Microscopically, its spores are narrower and more oval-shaped.

In California, what was thought to be L. laccata under eucalyptus has turned out to be the Australian species L. fraterna. Other similar species include L. amethysteo-occidentalis and L. bicolor.

== Distribution and habitat ==
Laccaria laccata is found in scattered troops in wooded areas, and on heathland often in poor soil. It is very common in all of the northern temperate zones, but tends to favor cool weather. It is mycorrhizal with several types of trees, including members of the Pinaceae (Pines), Fagaceae (Beech), and Betulaceae (Birch). It is found across Europe and North America, south into Mexico and Costa Rica. Laccaria species are mycorrhizal, and thought by some to be pioneer species. The roots of Corylus avellana (Hazel) are also used as a host for the fungus in Great Britain.

== Edibility ==
Although small, the deceiver is edible and mild-tasting. The tough stalks are usually not eaten. It is one of many mushrooms traditionally eaten by the Zapotec people of Oaxaca in Mexico. However, it is important to distinguish it from potentially lethal small brown mushrooms.
