= Laccaria amethystina =

Scientific classification
- Kingdom: Fungi
- Division: Basidiomycota
- Class: Agaricomycetes
- Order: Agaricales
- Family: Hydnangiaceae
- Genus: Laccaria
- Species: L. amethystina

Binomial name
- Laccaria amethystina (Huds.) Cooke

Synonyms
- Laccaria laccata var. amethystina (Cooke) Rea; Laccaria hudsonii Pázmány (1994)

Laccaria amethystina
- Mycological characteristics
- Gills on hymenium
- Cap is convex or depressed
- Hymenium is adnate or decurrent
- Stipe is bare
- Spore print is white
- Ecology is mycorrhizal
- Edibility is edible

Laccaria amethystina, commonly known as the amethyst deceiver, or amethyst laccaria, is a small brightly colored mushroom. Because its bright amethyst coloration fades with age and weathering, it becomes difficult to identify, hence the common name "deceiver". This common name is shared with its close relation L. laccata, which also fades and weathers. Recently, some of the other species in the genus have been given the common name of "deceiver".

It is found mainly in Northern temperate zones, in deciduous and coniferous forests, though it is reported to occur in tropical Central and South America as well. The mushroom is edible, but can absorb arsenic from the soil.

== Taxonomy ==
This species was first described in 1778 by well-known English botanist and apothecary William Hudson as Agaricus amethystinus, and later put into the genus Laccaria by Mordecai Cubitt Cooke. The amethyst deceiver has had many binomials over a great many years, but reference to the amethyst coloration is featured in most of these. It was once placed in the genus Collybia, as Collybia amethystina, which was probably due in part to its tough collybioid-like stem. Its present binomial places it in Laccaria, with the specific epithet amethystina, a pairing first used by Cooke in 1884. In 1922 it was named as a variety of L. laccata, var. amethystina (Cooke) Rea, which is now a synonym.

== Description ==
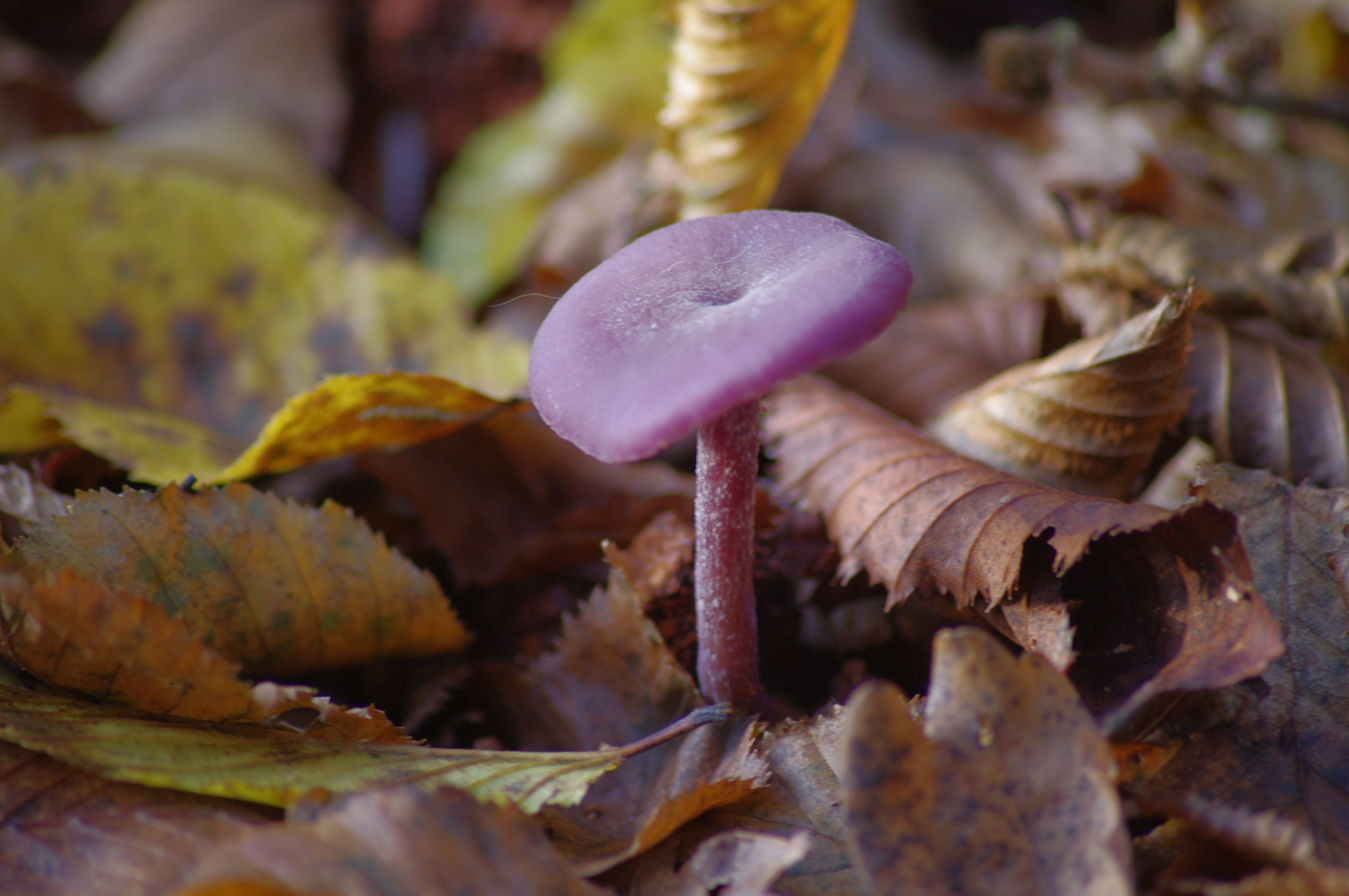
Laccaria amethystina

The cap is up to 6 centimetres (2 1/4 in) in diameter, and is initially convex, later flattening, typically with a central depression (navel). When moist it is a deep purplish lilac, which fades upon drying out. It is sometimes slightly scurfy at the center, and has pale striations at the margin.

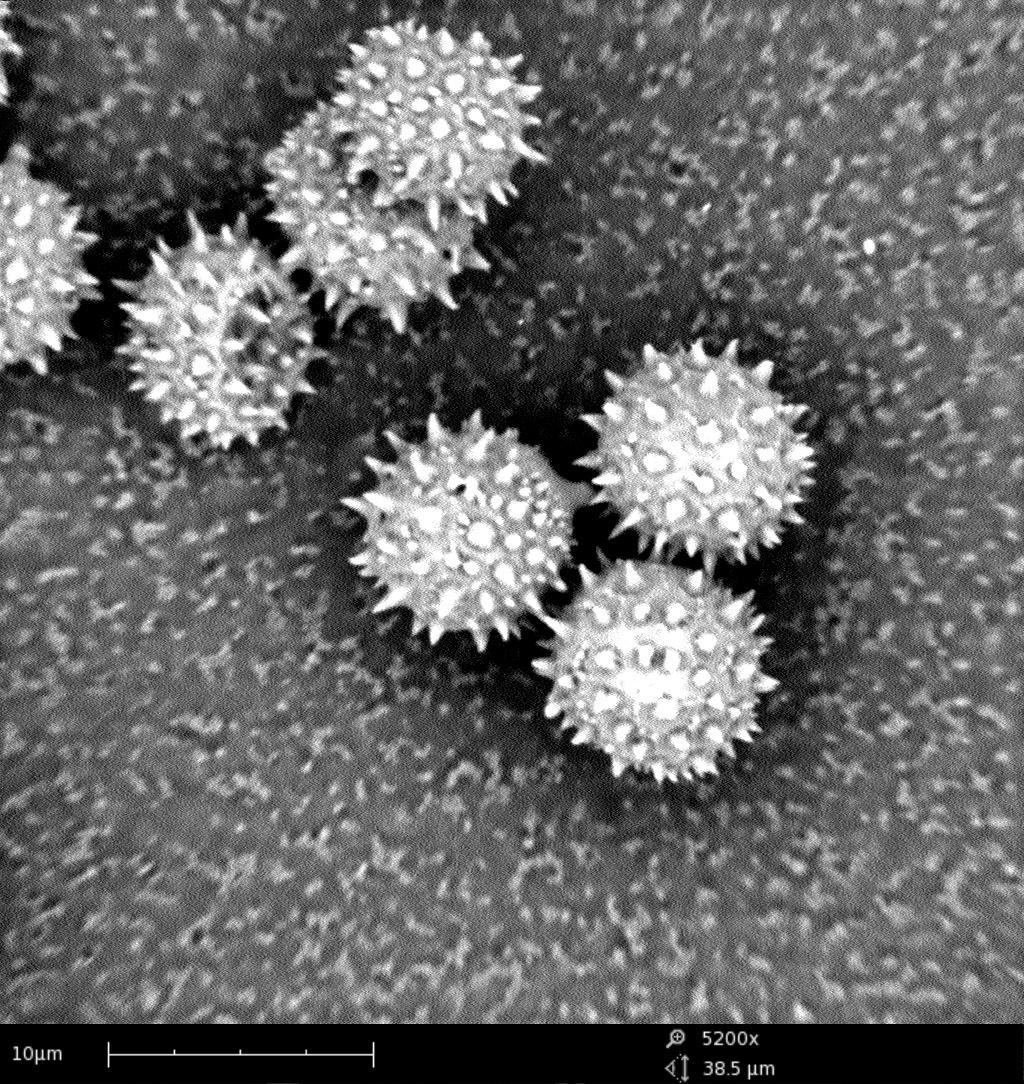
Electronmicroscopic image of spores of

The stem is the same colour as the cap, and has whitish fibrils at the base, which become mealy at the top. It is fibrous, hollow, fairly tough when rolled in the fingers, with dimensions of 0.6 to 7 cm (1/4 to 2 3/4 in) long by 0.1 to 0.7 cm (1/16 to 1/4 in) thick. The flesh is without a distinctive taste or smell, and is thin, with pale lilac coloration. The gills are colored as the cap, often quite distantly spaced, and are dusted by the white spores; their attachment to the stem is sinuate—having a concave indentation before attaching to the stem.

=== Microscopic characteristics ===
The spores are spherical and hyaline, and bear pointed spines (echinulate) that are long relative to the size of the spore; they typically have dimensions of 7–10 by 7–10 μm. The basidia, the spore-bearing cells, are club-shaped and hyaline, and are 30–64.5 by 8.5–14 μm.

=== Similar species ===
There are several purplish species in North America that were formally labeled as L. amethystina before Gregory M. Mueller described them as distinct species in 1984. Laccaria amethysteo-occidentalis is found in western North America. Besides geographical difference, L. amethysteo-occidentalis differs from L. amethystina in several ways: ecologically, the former occurs only in association with conifers, while the latter occurs mainly with hardwoods of the order Fagales. The sporocarp of L. amethysteo-occidentalis is on average larger than that of L. amethystina, and has a deeper purple coloration, that fades to vinaceous rather than brownish shades. The spores are also quite distinct between the two, in that the spores of L. amethysteo-occidentalis are not as strongly globose as those of L. amethystina, being generally of a subglobose or even broadly ellipsoid shape, and additionally having much shorter spines than the spores of L. amethystina.

Another species that was segregated by Mueller from L. amethystina is L. vinaceobrunnea, a species found in the Gulf Coast region of the southern United States. L. vinaceobrunnea is distinguished from L. amethystina and L. amethysteo-occidentalis macroscopically by color, with the former species having a deep purple color only in very young specimens, which soon fades to a violaceous- or reddish-brown color, and eventually to dull orange-brown or buff color with age. Its spore features are intermediate between L. amethystina and L. amethysteo-occidentalis, having a subglobose to broadly ellipsoid shape like L. amethysteo-occidentalis (rather than the strongly globose shape of L. amethystina spores) and long spines characteristic of L. amethystina. The pileipellis of L. vinaceobrunnea is unique within Laccaria, having a distinct palisadoderm, rather than the undifferentiated type or fasciculate trichoderm that is characteristic of other species of Laccaria. L. vinaceobrunnea is also somewhat distinguished by habitat, being highly specific in association with Quercus virginiana. L. amethystina is also often associated with this species, but is associated with many other tree species in the Fagales as well.

In 1988, a third species of purple Laccaria, L. gomezii, was described by Mueller as distinct from L. amethystina. This species is associated with Quercus and is endemic to the cloud forests of Central America and northern South America (habitats in which L. amethystina also occurs). L. gomezii is similar to L. vinaceobrunnea in a number of characteristics, but the fresh sporocarp is a darker purple than either L. vinaceobrunnea or L. amethystina. Its lamellae distinguish it from other members of the L. amethystina group, with L. gomezii having attached to subdecurrant, very closely spaced lamellae, in contrast to the sinuate to arcuate, narrowly attached lamellae of other species in this group. The spores of L. gomezii are similar to those of L. vinaceobrunnea and Laccaria amethysteo-occidentalis, and it lacks the distinct pileipellis hyphae of L. vinaceobrunnea.

== Distribution and habitat ==
The species is common in most temperate zones of Europe (June–December), Asia, Central, South, and eastern North America. It grows solitary to scattered with a variety of deciduous and coniferous trees, with which it is mycorrhizally associated, though it most commonly occurs with trees in the Fagales. It appears in late summer to early winter, and often with beech; in Central and South America, it more commonly grows in association with oak. Research has shown that L. amethystina is a so-called "ammonia fungus", an ecological classification referring to those fungi that grow abundantly on soil after the addition of ammonia, or other nitrogen-containing material; the congeneric species Laccaria bicolor is also an ammonia fungus.

== Edibility ==
As with other members of the genus, this species is edible, though generally not considered choice. While not inherently toxic, in soils that are polluted with arsenic, it can bioaccumulate a high concentration of that element. The gills of nontoxic specimens should be cleaned thoroughly.
