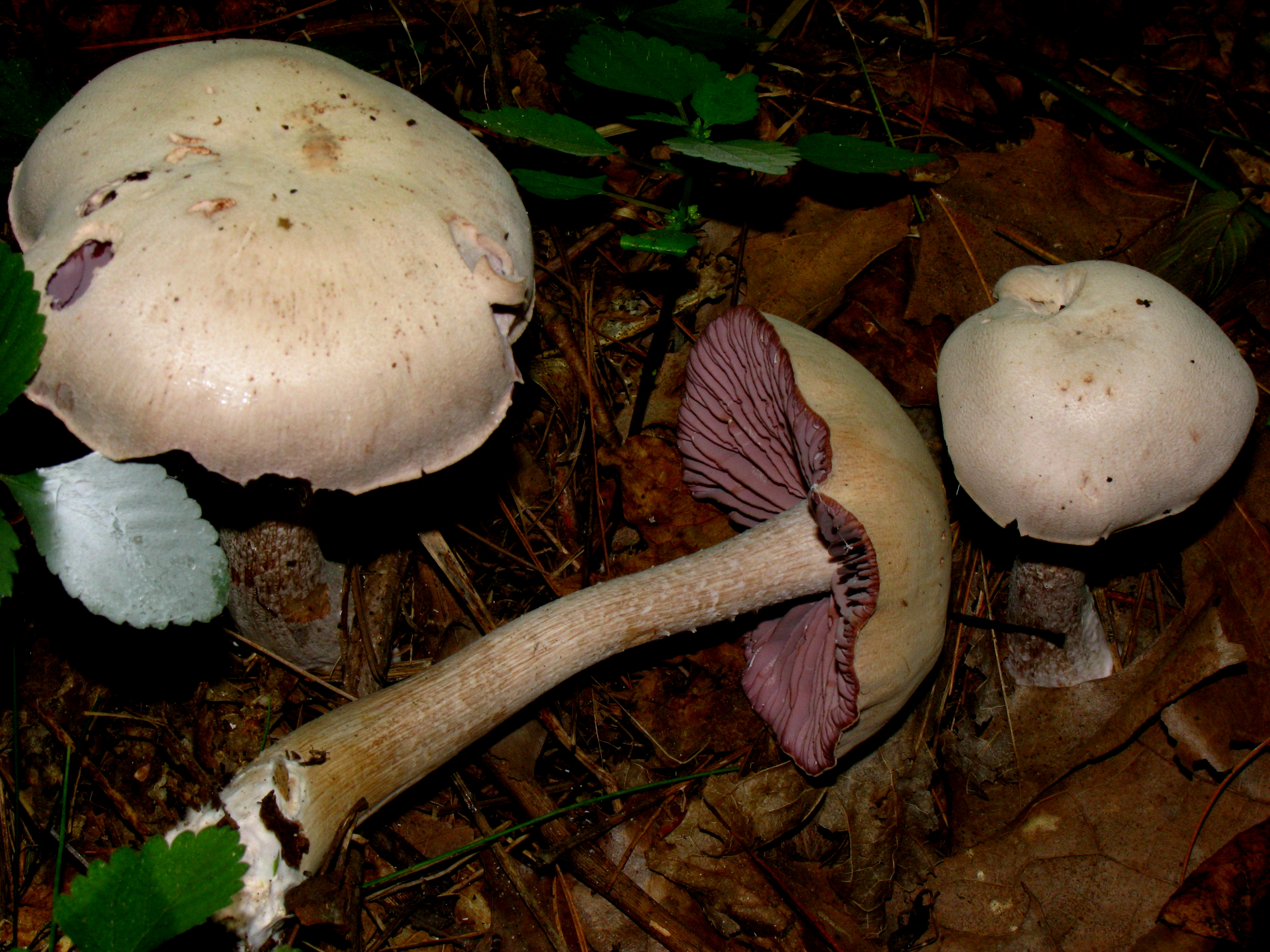

Scientific classification
- Domain: Eukaryota
- Kingdom: Fungi
- Division: Basidiomycota
- Class: Agaricomycetes
- Order: Agaricales
- Family: Hydnangiaceae
- Genus: Laccaria
- Species: L. ochropurpurea

Binomial name
- Laccaria ochropurpurea (Berk.) Peck, 1896

= Laccaria ochropurpurea =

Species of edible mushroom

Laccaria ochropurpurea is a species of fungus. The pinkish to yellowish cap ranges from 4–13 centimetres (1 1/2–5 in) wide and the stipe from 5–19 cm (2–7 1/2 in) long. The gills are purple and the spore print is white. It can resemble species such as L. trullisata (found in sand), Cortinarius torvus, and C. lucorum.

Found under hardwood and conifers east of the Rocky Mountains from July to October, L. ochropurpurea produces an edible mushroom.
