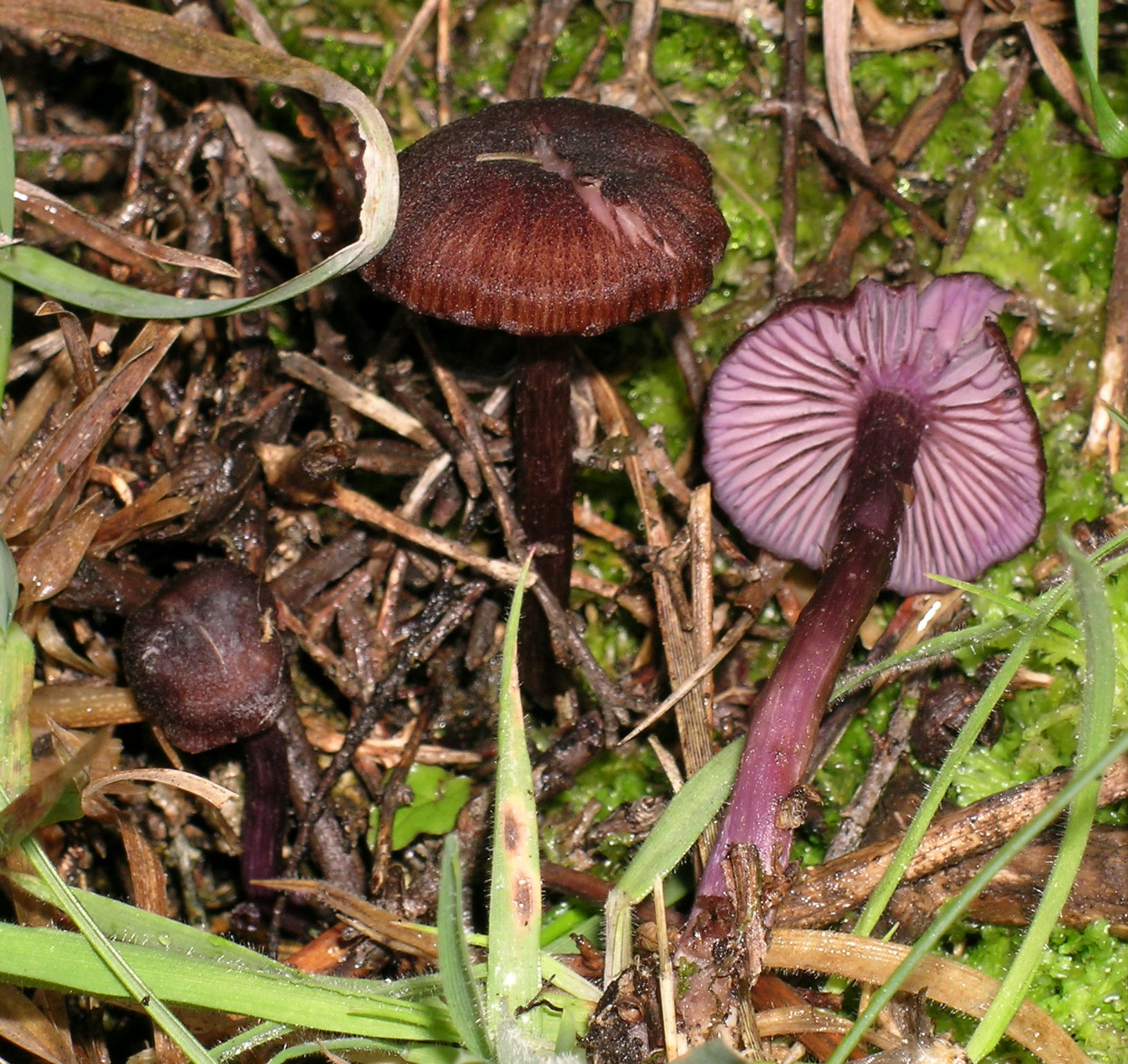
- Laccaria violaceonigra fruiting bodies

Scientific classification
- Kingdom: Fungi
- Division: Basidiomycota
- Class: Agaricomycetes
- Order: Agaricales
- Family: Hydnangiaceae
- Genus: Laccaria
- Species: L. masoniae

Binomial name
- Laccaria masoniae G.Stev. (1964)

= Laccaria violaceonigra =

Species of fungus

Laccaria violaceonigra
- Mycological characteristics
- Gills on hymenium
- Cap is convex
- Hymenium is adnate or adnexed
- Spore print is white
- Ecology is mycorrhizal
- Edibility is unknown

Laccaria violaceonigra is a species of mushroom of the family Hydnangiaceae. It was first described by the New Zealand mycologist Greta Stevenson in 1964. The fungus is endemic to New Zealand. It fruits on soil and forms ectomycorrhizal relationships with Nothofagus trees.

== Taxonomy ==
Laccaria violaceonigra was first described by the New Zealand mycologist Greta Stevenson in 1964. The type specimen was collected at Dun Mountain in Nelson, New Zealand.

== Description ==
The fruit bodies (basidiocarps) of L. violaceonigra have caps (pilei) which can reach 3.5 centimetres (1.4 inches) in diameter. The caps are convex to plano-convex in shape. They are hygrophanous, meaning their colour changes as they lose moisture, and are not slimy when moist. The cap surface is often finely grooved around the margins, with tiny scales concentrated in the centre and fine scales extending towards the edges, giving it a velvety appearance. The gills (lamellae) are a pale violet colour, but can have a glaucous tint. The gills are adnexed to adnate, relatively distant, and up to 5 mm deep. The stipe measures 3–6 cm in length and width. They are cylindrical and hollow. The stipe is pale violet when young, gradually becoming pale reddish-brown to pale tan from the base upwards as it matures, eventually becoming entirely pale tan. The basal mycelium is pale violet.

The spore print is white. The spores are generally globe-shaped or nearly so, but can be occasionally broadly ellipsoid. They are transparent and moderately spiny, measuring 8–10 μm in diameter. The spines are 0.7–1.5 μm long. The basidia are club-shaped, and measure 32–42 × 7.5–10.5 μm, with sterigmata up to 9 μm long. The smell and taste of the mushroom are unknown.

== Distribution and habitat ==
Laccaria violaceonigra is endemic to New Zealand. It fruits in groups or clumps, and is only found in ectomycorrhizal association with Nothofagus species. It has been recorded in leaf litter of Nothofagus truncata and in soil under Nothofagus menziesii.

== Works cited ==
Journals

- McKenzie, E. H. C.; Buchanan, P. K.; Johnston, P. R. (2000). "Checklist of Fungi on Nothofagus species in New Zealand". New Zealand Journal of Botany. 38 (4): 635–720. Bibcode:2000NZJB...38..635M. doi:10.1080/0028825X.2000.9512711.
- McNabb, R. F. R. (1972). "The Tricholomataceae of New Zealand 1. Laccaria Berk. & Br". New Zealand Journal of Botany. 10 (3): 461–484. Bibcode:1972NZJB...10..461M. doi:10.1080/0028825X.1972.10428618.
- Nilsen, Andy R.; Teasdale, Suliana E.; Guy, Paul L.; Summerfield, Tina C.; Orlovich, David A. (2020). "Fungal Diversity in Canopy Soil of Silver Beech, Nothofagus menziesii (Nothofagaceae)". PLOS One. 15 (1) e0227860. Bibcode:2020PLoSO..1527860N. doi:10.1371/journal.pone.0227860. PMC 6980614. PMID 31978185.
- Stevenson, Greta (1964). "The Agaricales of New Zealand: V". Kew Bulletin. 19 (1): 1–59. Bibcode:1964KewBu..19....1S. doi:10.2307/4108283. JSTOR 4108283.
