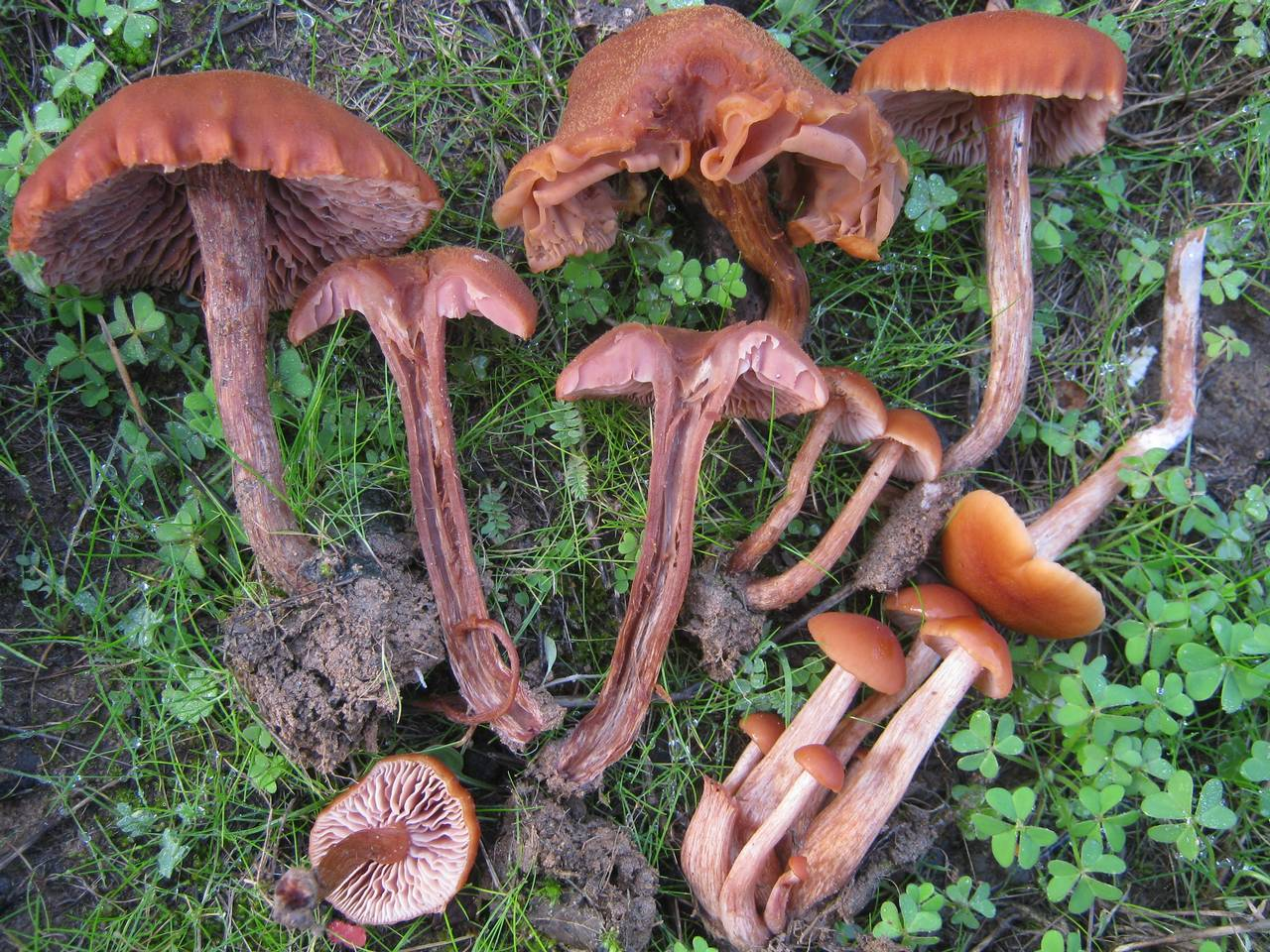

Scientific classification
- Domain: Eukaryota
- Kingdom: Fungi
- Division: Basidiomycota
- Class: Agaricomycetes
- Order: Agaricales
- Family: Hydnangiaceae
- Genus: Laccaria
- Species: L. proxima

Binomial name
- Laccaria proxima (Boud.) Pat.

Synonyms
- Clitocybe proxima Boud.; Laccaria laccata var. proxima (Boud.) Maire

= Laccaria proxima =

Species of fungus

Laccaria proxima Mycological characteristics
- Gills on hymenium
- Cap is convex or depressed
- Hymenium is adnate or decurrent
- Stipe is bare
- Spore print is white
- Ecology is mycorrhizal
- Edibility is edible

Laccaria proxima is a species of edible mushroom in the genus Laccaria from the conifer forest of California, as well as eastern and northern North America.
