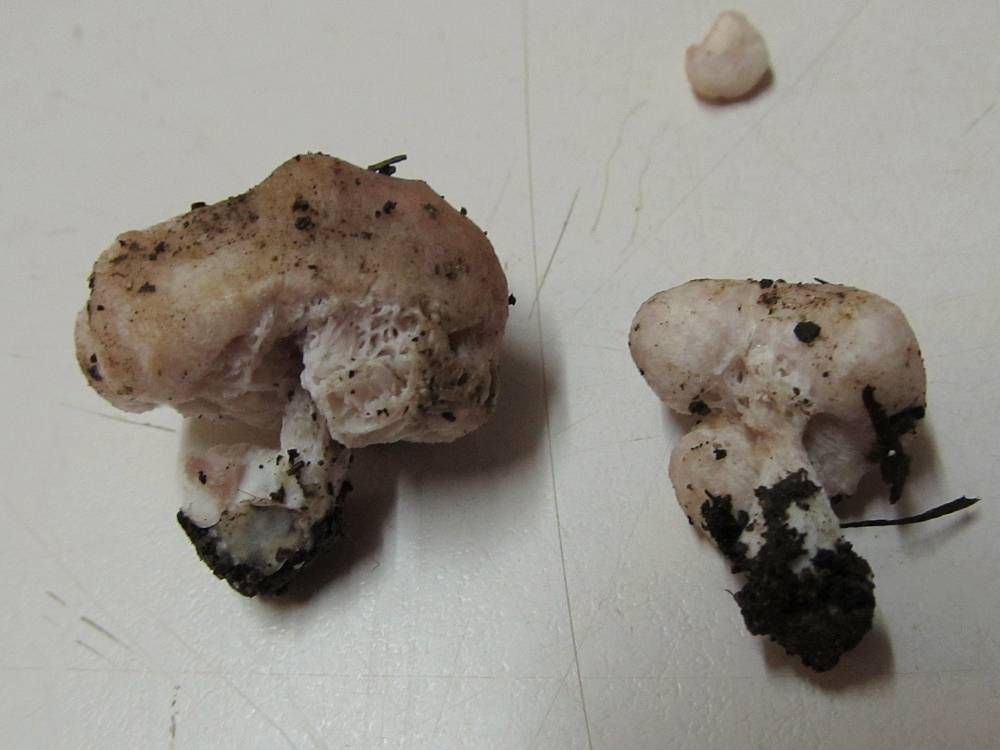
- From Tarra-Bulga National Park, Victoria, Australia

Scientific classification
- Kingdom: Fungi
- Division: Basidiomycota
- Class: Agaricomycetes
- Order: Agaricales
- Family: Hydnangiaceae
- Genus: Podohydnangium; G.W.Beaton, Pegler & T.W.K.Young (1984)
- Species: P. australe

Binomial name
- Podohydnangium australe G.W.Beaton, Pegler & T.W.K.Young (1984)

= Podohydnangium =

Genus of fungi

Podohydnangium is a fungal genus in the family Hydnangiaceae. A monotypic genus, it contains the single gasteroid species Podohydnangium australe, found in Australia.
