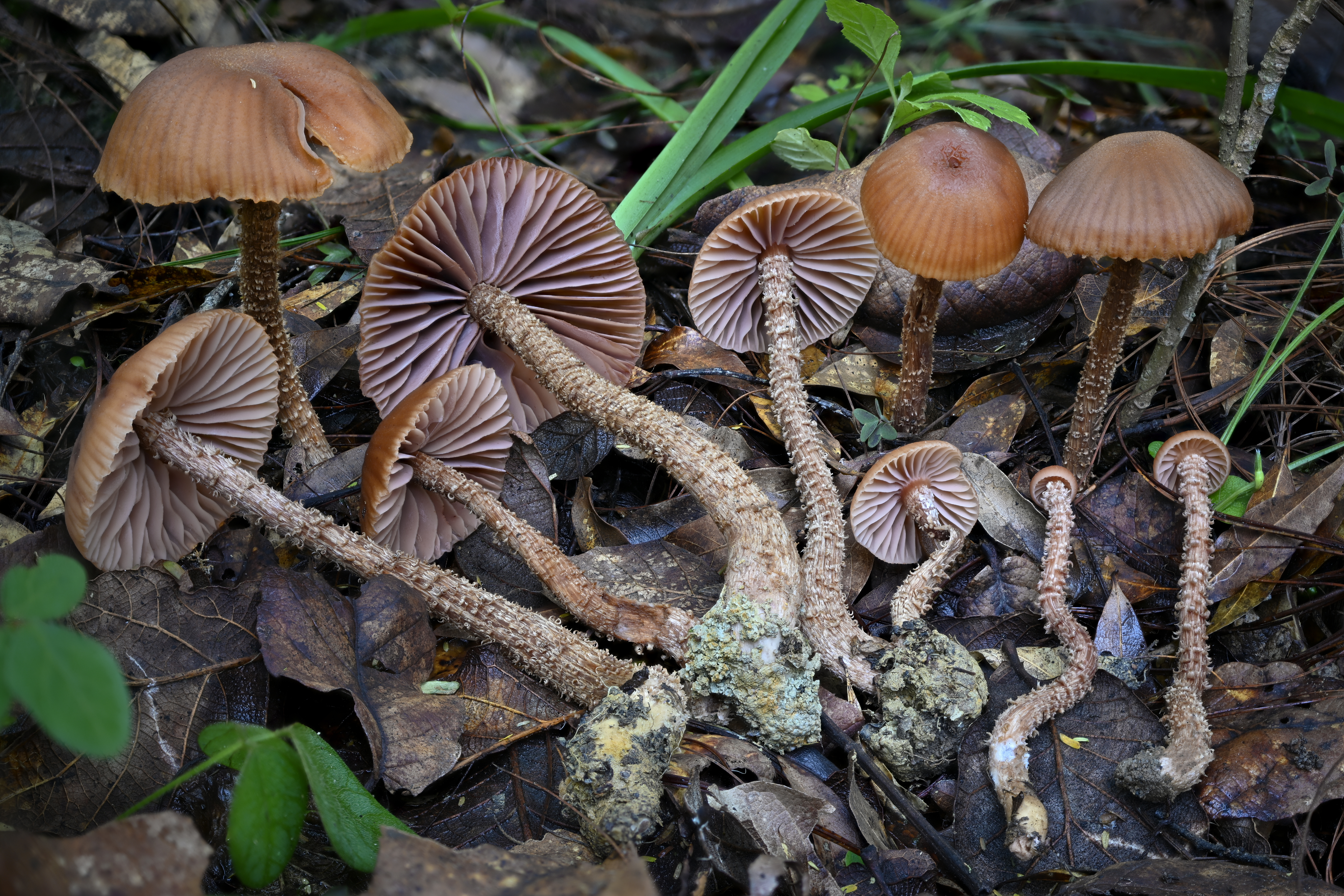
- Laccaria squarrosa

Scientific classification
- Kingdom: Fungi
- Division: Basidiomycota
- Class: Agaricomycetes
- Order: Agaricales
- Family: Hydnangiaceae
- Genus: Laccaria; Berk. & Broome (1883)

Type species
- Laccaria laccata (Scop.) Cooke (1884)

Species
- See text

= Laccaria =

Genus of fungi

Laccaria is a genus around 100 species of fungus found in both temperate and tropical regions of the world. They are mycorrhizal. The type species is Laccaria laccata, commonly known as the deceiver. Other notable species include L. bicolor, and the amethyst deceiver (L. amethystina), sometimes incorrectly written as L. amethystea. Because some Laccaria species have the ability to grow vegetatively and/or germinate from basidiospores in culture, they are often used as experimental systems for studies of ectomycorrhizal basidiomycetes. They have a tetrapolar mating system, meaning that the mating type is controlled by two loci. Recently, the genome of L. bicolor has been sequenced.

== Description ==
Laccaria typically have thick, widely spaced, purple to flesh-colored gills that are adnate to slightly decurrent in attachment. The spores are white and ornamented in most species.

== Species ==
The following is an list of Laccaria species reported in the literature:

Image	Name	Year	Distribution
	Laccaria acanthospora A.W. Wilson & G.M. Muell.	2013	
	Laccaria alba Zhu L. Yang & Lan Wang	2004	
	Laccaria amethysteo-occidentalis G.M. Muell.	1984	western North America
	Laccaria amethystina Cooke	1884	Europe, Asia, Central and South America, eastern North America
	Laccaria angustilamella Zhu L. Yang & L. Wang	2004	
	Laccaria araneosa H.J. Cho & Y.W. Lim	2018	
	Laccaria aurantia Popa, Rexer, Donges, Zhu L. Yang & G. Kost	2014	China
	Laccaria avachaensis Kalamees	1993	
	Laccaria bella (Pers.) Cooke	1884	
	Laccaria bicolor (Maire) P.D. Orton	1960	North America
	Laccaria bisporigera Contu & Ballero	1993	
	Laccaria bullipellis A.W. Wilson & G.M. Muell.	2013	
	Laccaria bullulifera Singer	1965	
	Laccaria caerulacea Dhanch., J.C. Bhatt & S.K. Pant	1991	
	Laccaria calosperma Beeli	1933	
	Laccaria calospora Singer	1973	
	Laccaria canaliculata (Sacc.) Massee	1899	
	Laccaria chibinensis Mikhailovskii	1974	Russia
	Laccaria cyanolamellata B.E. Lechner & J.E. Wright	2006	
	Laccaria echinospora (Speg.) Singer	1943	
	Laccaria edulis Bouriquet	1946	
	Laccaria fengkaiensis Fang Li	2020	
	Laccaria fibrillosa McNabb	1972	
	Laccaria flavobrunnea Lebedeva	1949	
	Laccaria fraterna (Sacc.) Pegler	1965	
	Laccaria fulvogrisea Popa, Rexer & G. Kost	2014	China
	Laccaria galerinoides Singer	1965	
	Laccaria gibba (Singer) Pázmány	1994	
	Laccaria glabripes McNabb	1972	
	Laccaria globosa Gardezi	2005	
	Laccaria gomezii Singer & G.M. Muell.	1988	
	Laccaria goossensiae (Beeli) Contu	2003	
	Laccaria griseolilacina H.J. Cho & Y.W. Lim	2020	
	Laccaria halosperma Beeli	1933	
	Laccaria himalayensis A.W. Wilson & G.M. Muell.	2013	
	Laccaria indohimalayana K. Das, I. Bera & Vizzini	2019	
	Laccaria japonica Popa & K. Nara	2017	Japan
	Laccaria laccata (Scop.) Cooke	1884	
	Laccaria lateritia Malençon	1966	
	Laccaria lilacina G. Stev.	1964	
	Laccaria longipes G.M. Muell.	1991	
	Laccaria lutea (J.C. Buxb.) Ballero & Contu	1989	
	Laccaria macrobasidia H.J. Cho & Y.W. Lim	2020	
	Laccaria macrocystidiata (Migl. & Lavorato) Pázmány	1994	
	Laccaria maritima (Theodor.) Singer ex Huhtinen	1987	
	Laccaria masoniae G. Stev.	1964	
	Laccaria montana Singer	1973	
	Laccaria moshuijun Popa & Zhu Liang Yang	2017	China
	Laccaria murina S. Imai	1938	
	Laccaria negrimarginata A.W. Wilson & G.M. Muell.	2013	
	Laccaria nigra Hongo	1959	
	Laccaria nobilis A.H. Sm.	1984	
	Laccaria oblongospora G.M. Muell.	1984	
	Laccaria ochropurpurea (Berk.) Peck	1897	
	Laccaria ochrosquamulosa (Ballero & Contu) Pázmány	1994	
	Laccaria ohiensis (Mont.) Singer	1947	
	Laccaria olivaceogrisea Vellinga	1987	
	Laccaria paraphysata (McNabb) J.A. Cooper	2014	
	Laccaria parva H.J. Cho & Y.W. Lim	2018	
	Laccaria prava Fang Li	2020	
	Laccaria proxima (Boud.) Pat.	1887	
	Laccaria proximella Singer	1965	
	Laccaria pruinosipes (Vellinga) Pázmány	1994	
	Laccaria pseudomontana Osmundson, C.L. Cripps & G.M. Muell.	2006	
	Laccaria pumila Fayod	1893	
	Laccaria purpureobadia D.A. Reid	1966	
	Laccaria roseoalbescens T.J. Baroni, Montoya & Bandala	2015	
	Laccaria rubroalba X. Luo, L. Ye, P.E. Mortimer & K.D. Hyde	2016	
	Laccaria salmonicolor A.W. Wilson & G.M. Muell.	2013	
	Laccaria singeri Locq. & Sarwal	1983	
	Laccaria spodophora (Berk. & Broome) Cooke	1884	
	Laccaria squarrosa Bandala, Montoya & A. Ramos	2017	
	Laccaria stellata Popa & S.Y. Castillo	2016	
	Laccaria striatula (Peck) Peck	1912	
	Laccaria tetraspora Singer	1947	
	Laccaria torosa H.J. Cho & Y.W. Lim	2018	
	Laccaria tortilis (Bolton) Cooke	1884	
	Laccaria transilvanica Pázmány	1991	
	Laccaria trichodermophora G.M. Muell.	1984	
	Laccaria trullisata (Ellis) Peck	1912	
	Laccaria versiforma H.J. Cho & Y.W. Lim	2018	
	Laccaria versiformis H.J. Cho & Y.W. Lim	2018	
	Laccaria vinaceoavellanea Hongo	1971	
	Laccaria vinaceobrunnea G.M. Muell.	1984	
	Laccaria vinaceorosea Contu	1998	
	Laccaria vinosofusca (Berk. & Broome) Cooke	1884	
	Laccaria violaceibasis Contu & Fern. Sas.	2003	
	Laccaria violaceonigra G. Stev.	1964	
	Laccaria violaceotincta K.P.D. Latha, K.N.A. Raj & Manim.	2019	
	Laccaria vulcanica (Singer ex Singer & J. Veselský) Pázmány	1994	
	Laccaria yunnanensis Popa, Rexer, Donges, Zhu L. Yang & G. Kost	2014	China
