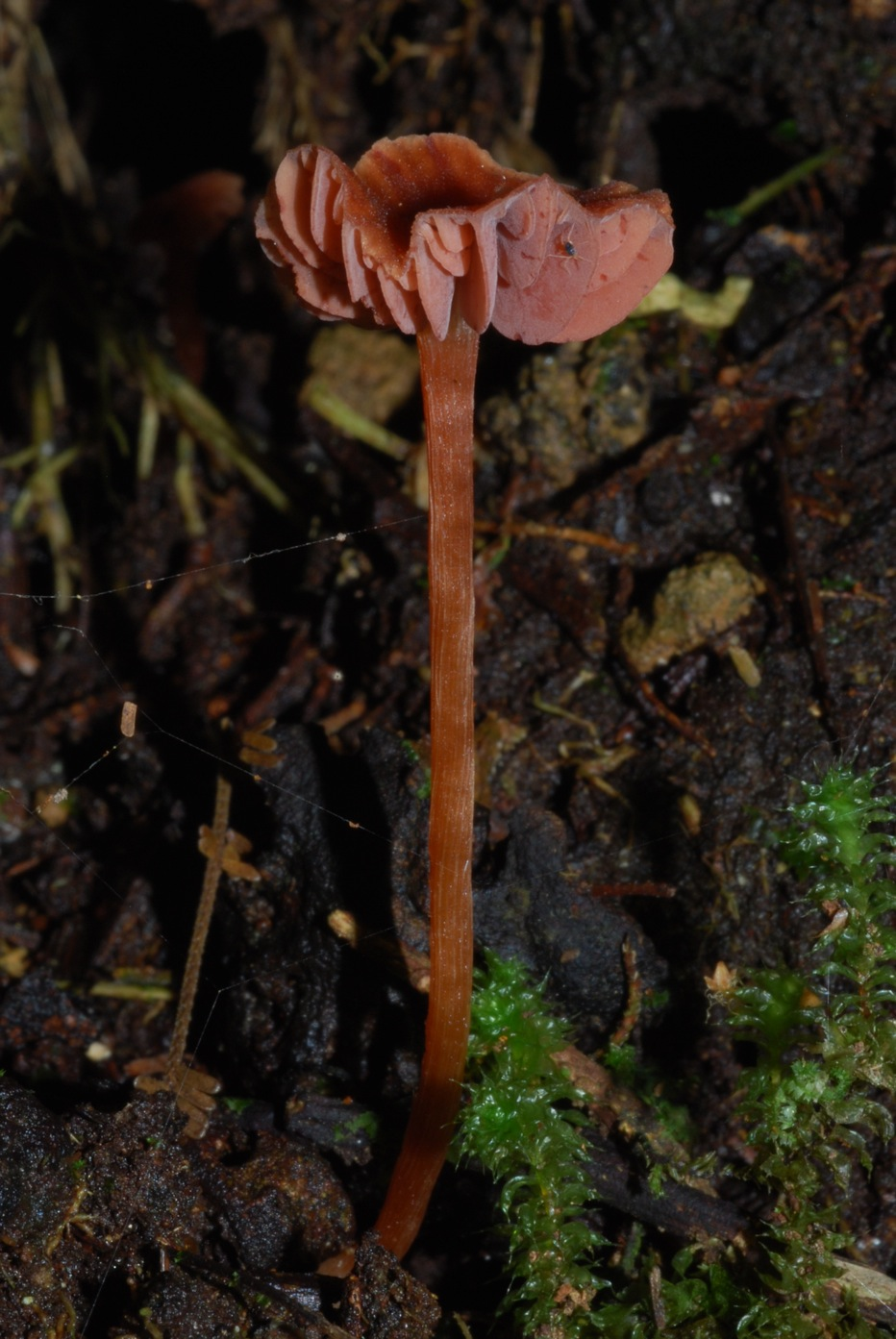

Scientific classification
- Domain: Eukaryota
- Kingdom: Fungi
- Division: Basidiomycota
- Class: Agaricomycetes
- Order: Agaricales
- Family: Hydnangiaceae
- Genus: Laccaria
- Species: L. fraterna

Binomial name
- Laccaria fraterna (Cooke & Massee) Pegler

Synonyms
- Laccaria lateritia Malençon

= Laccaria fraterna =

Species of fungus

Laccaria fraterna Mycological characteristics
- Gills on hymenium
- Cap is convex or depressed
- Hymenium is adnate or decurrent
- Stipe is bare
- Spore print is white
- Ecology is mycorrhizal
- Edibility is unknown

Laccaria fraterna is a species of Laccaria that grows on Eucalyptus and Acacia trees.
