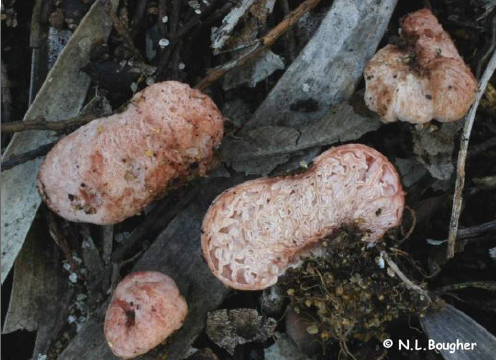
- Hydnangium carneum - pink false truffle

Scientific classification
- Kingdom: Fungi
- Division: Basidiomycota
- Class: Agaricomycetes
- Order: Agaricales
- Family: Hydnangiaceae
- Genus: Hydnangium; Wallr. (1839)

Type species
- Hydnangium carneum Wallr. (1839)

= Hydnangium =

Genus of basidiomycete fungi in the family Hydnangiaceae

Hydnangium is a genus of truffle-like fungi in the family Hydnangiaceae. All species in this genus are known to form ectomycorrhizal associations with trees.

== Species ==
- Hydnangium aurantiacum R. Heim & Malençon (1934)
- Hydnangium carneum Wallr. (1839)
- Hydnangium densum Rodway (1920)
- Hydnangium kanuka J.A. Cooper (2014)
- Hydnangium latisporum Castellano, Cázares & G. Guevara (2008)
- Hydnangium parksii Zeller & C.W. Dodge (1937)
- Hydnangium purpureum (Coker & Couch) Zeller & C.W. Dodge (1937)
- Hydnangium quercicola Castellano, Cázares & G. Guevara (2008)
- Hydnangium redactum Dring (1978)
- Hydnangium sublamellatum Bougher, Tommerup & Malajczuk (1993)
- Hydnangium thaxteri Zeller & C.W. Dodge (1935)
- Hydnangium velatisporum Castellano, Cázares & G. Guevara (2008)
