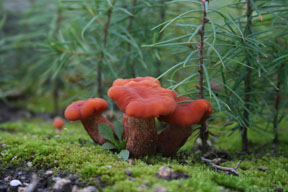

Scientific classification
- Kingdom: Fungi
- Division: Basidiomycota
- Class: Agaricomycetes
- Order: Agaricales
- Family: Hydnangiaceae
- Genus: Laccaria
- Species: L. bicolor

Binomial name
- Laccaria bicolor (Maire) P.D.Orton (1960)

Synonyms
- Laccaria laccata var. bicolor Maire (1937); Laccaria proxima var. bicolor (Maire) Kuhner & Romagn. (1953); Laccaria laccata var. pseudobicolor Bon (1982)

= Laccaria bicolor =

Laccaria bicolor Mycological characteristics
- Gills on hymenium
- Cap is convex or depressed
- Hymenium is adnate
- Stipe is bare
- Spore print is white
- Ecology is mycorrhizal
- Edibility is edible

Laccaria bicolor is a small tan-colored mushroom with lilac gills. It is edible but not choice, and grows in mixed birch and pine woods. It is found in the temperate zones of the globe, in late summer and autumn. L. bicolor is an ectomycorrhizal fungus used as a soil inoculant in agriculture and horticulture.

== Taxonomy ==
It was initially described as a subspecies of Laccaria laccata by French mycologist René Maire in 1937, before being raised to species rank by P.D. Orton in 1960. Like others in its genus it has the common name of 'Deceiver', because of its propensity to fade and become hard to identify.

== Description ==
The cap is 2–4.5 cm (0.8–1.8 in) across, convex to flat, and with a central navel. It is often incurved at the margin, and is various shades of ochraceous-buff, and tan, depending on moisture content. Young specimens are quite vividly colored, but more often are found duller in appearance. The fibrillose stipe is the same color, and with a distinct lilac down towards the base. The flesh is whitish, tinged with pink, or ochraceous, and has no apparent distinctive smell, or taste. The gills are pale lilac at first, fading paler. The spores are white.

== Distribution and habitat ==
This species is mycorrhizal with a range of trees, and is found throughout the temperate zones of the world, in summer and autumn. This includes temperate and boreal forests of North America and probably Northern Europe. It seems to prefer birch and pine woods.

== Carnivory ==
Laccaria bicolor is one of a number of species of carnivorous fungi, but one of the few that catches and kills arthropods, specifically springtails.

== Ectomycorrhizae ==
This species forms ectomycorrhizal associations with a wide variety of tree species, such as red pine, jack pine, and black spruce. Studies have shown that L. bicolor is more effective in early colonization of pine roots compared to other ectomycorrhiza forming fungi. In field studies, it preferentially colonizes and improves the survival of red pine. Actinobacteria isolates, e.g. from the genus Streptomyces, obtained from old growth Norway spruce field sites have been shown to stimulate the growth of Laccaria bicolor in the laboratory.

== Genome ==
Laccaria bicolor was the first ectomycorrhizal fungus to have its genome sequenced. The genome is 65 megabases long and is estimated to contain 20,000 protein coding genes. Analysis revealed a large number of small secreted proteins of unknown function, several of which are only expressed in symbiotic tissues, where they probably play a role in initiating symbiosis. It lacks enzymes that are able to degrade plant cell walls but does possess enzymes which can degrade other polysaccharides, revealing how it is able to grow both in soil and in association with plants.
