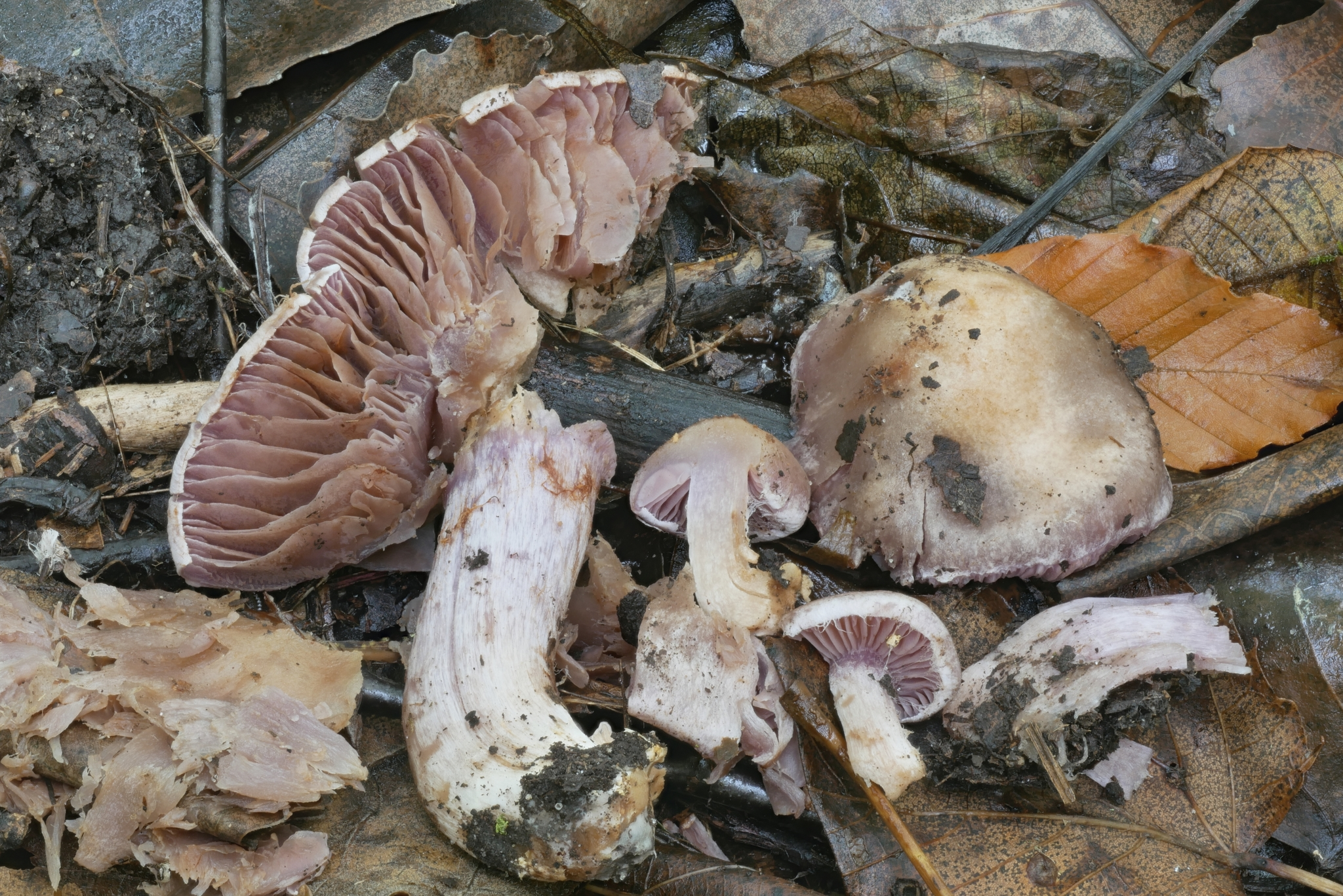

Scientific classification
- Kingdom: Fungi
- Division: Basidiomycota
- Class: Agaricomycetes
- Order: Agaricales
- Family: Cortinariaceae
- Genus: Cortinarius
- Species: C. lucorum

Binomial name
- Cortinarius lucorum (Fr.) E. Berger

= Cortinarius lucorum =

Species of fungus

Cortinarius lucorum
- Mycological characteristics
- Gills on hymenium
- Cap is convex or flat
- Hymenium is adnate
- Stipe has a cortina
- Spore print is reddish-brown
- Ecology is mycorrhizal
- Edibility is unknown

Cortinarius lucorum is a species of mushroom in the family Cortinariaceae.

== Description ==
The cap of Cortinarius lucorum is usually grayish brown with a hint of purple. It starts out round, before becoming convex or flat. It is about 3-7 centimeters in diameter. The stipe is approximately 6-7 centimeters long and 0.7-1.4 centimeters wide. It is fibrillose, and has a cortina. The gills are adnate and purplish to brownish in color, and the spore print is rusty brown.

== Habitat and ecology ==
Cortinarius lucorum is found in mixed forests. It is likely mycorrhizal with trees of the genus Populus, which it often grows under.
