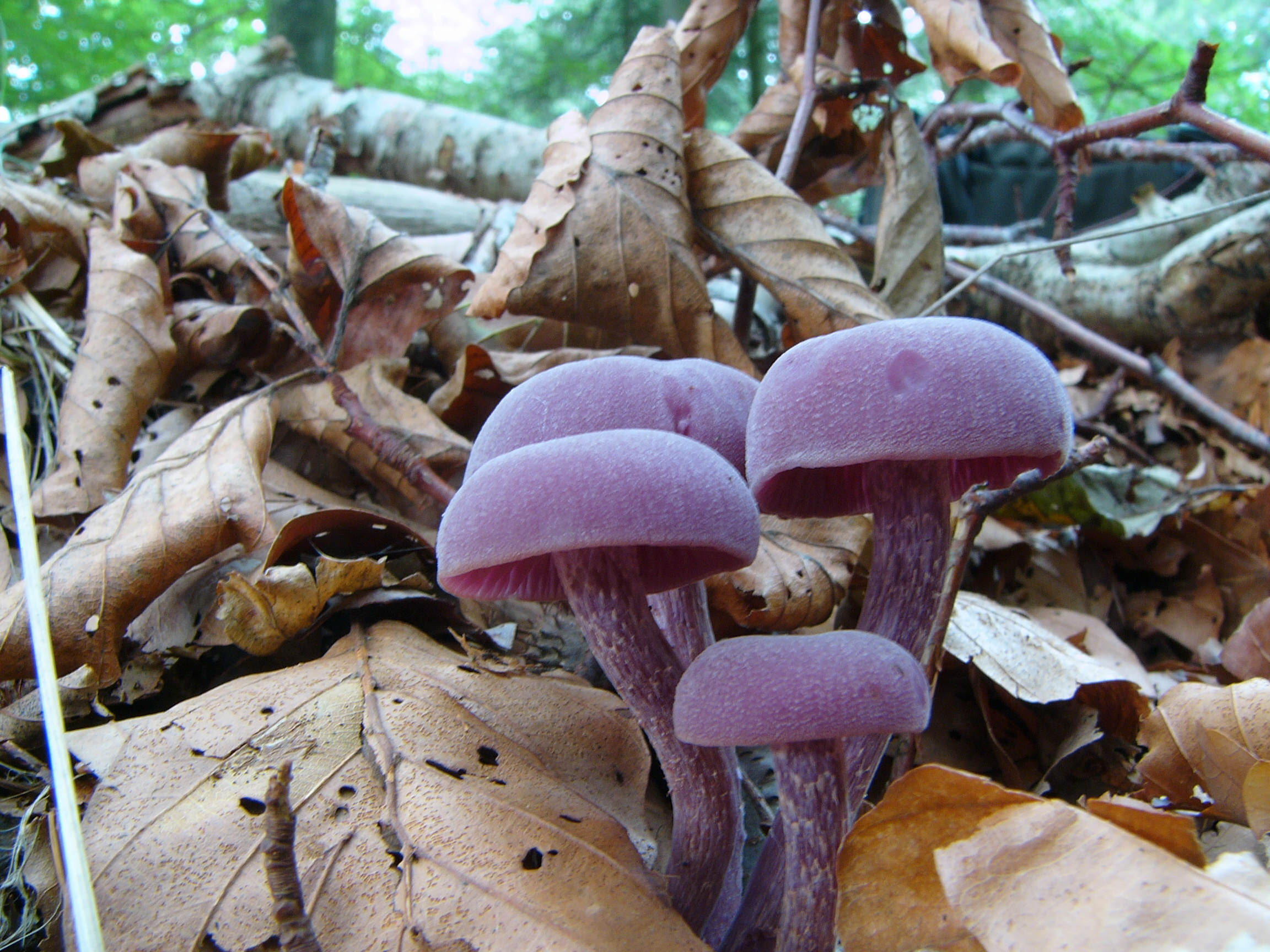
- Laccaria amethystina

Scientific classification
- Kingdom: Fungi
- Division: Basidiomycota
- Class: Agaricomycetes
- Order: Agaricales
- Family: Hydnangiaceae; Gäum. & C.W.Dodge (1928)

Type genus
- Hydnangium Wallr. (1839)

Genera
- Hydnangium; Laccaria; Maccagnia; Podohydnangium

= Hydnangiaceae =

Family of fungi

The Hydnangiaceae are a family of fungi in the mushroom order Agaricales. Widespread in temperate and tropical regions throughout the world, the family contains about 30 species in four genera. Species in the Hydnangiaceae form ectomycorrhizal relationships with various species of trees in both coniferous and deciduous forests.

== Description ==
They may have fruit bodies with stipes and caps (pileate-stipiate), or gasteroid (with internal spore production, like puffballs). When pileate, the cap is smooth to scaly, sometimes striate, typically orange-brown or violet in color. The gills are widely spaced, thick, and waxy. In gasteroid forms, fruit body shape is irregular, with thin walls. Also, the peridium (the outer layer of the spore-bearing organ) is sometimes short-lasting (evanescent). Columella (the central, sterile part of the sporangium) may be absent or present, the hymenia are not gelatinized, and are formed in locules. Basidia are club-shaped (clavate), with two or four sterigmata, sometimes with accompanying cheilocystidia (cystidia on the edges of gills).

== Distribution and habitat ==
Hydnangiaceae taxa have a widespread distribution in both temperate and tropical zones.

== Ecology ==
Hydnangiaceae species are ectomycorrhizal, forming symbiotic relationships with various plant species, and have an important role in forest ecosystems.

== Genera ==
- Hydnangium has hypogeal fruit bodies like truffles, with no stipe, nor a columella.
- Laccaria has 'typical' mushroom-shaped (pileate-stipiate) fruit bodies.
- Maccagnia is a poorly known gasteroid genus containing a single species from Italy.
- Podohydnangium has subepigeal fruit bodies, with partially exposed gleba at the base and a stipe columnella.

== See also ==
- List of Agaricales families
