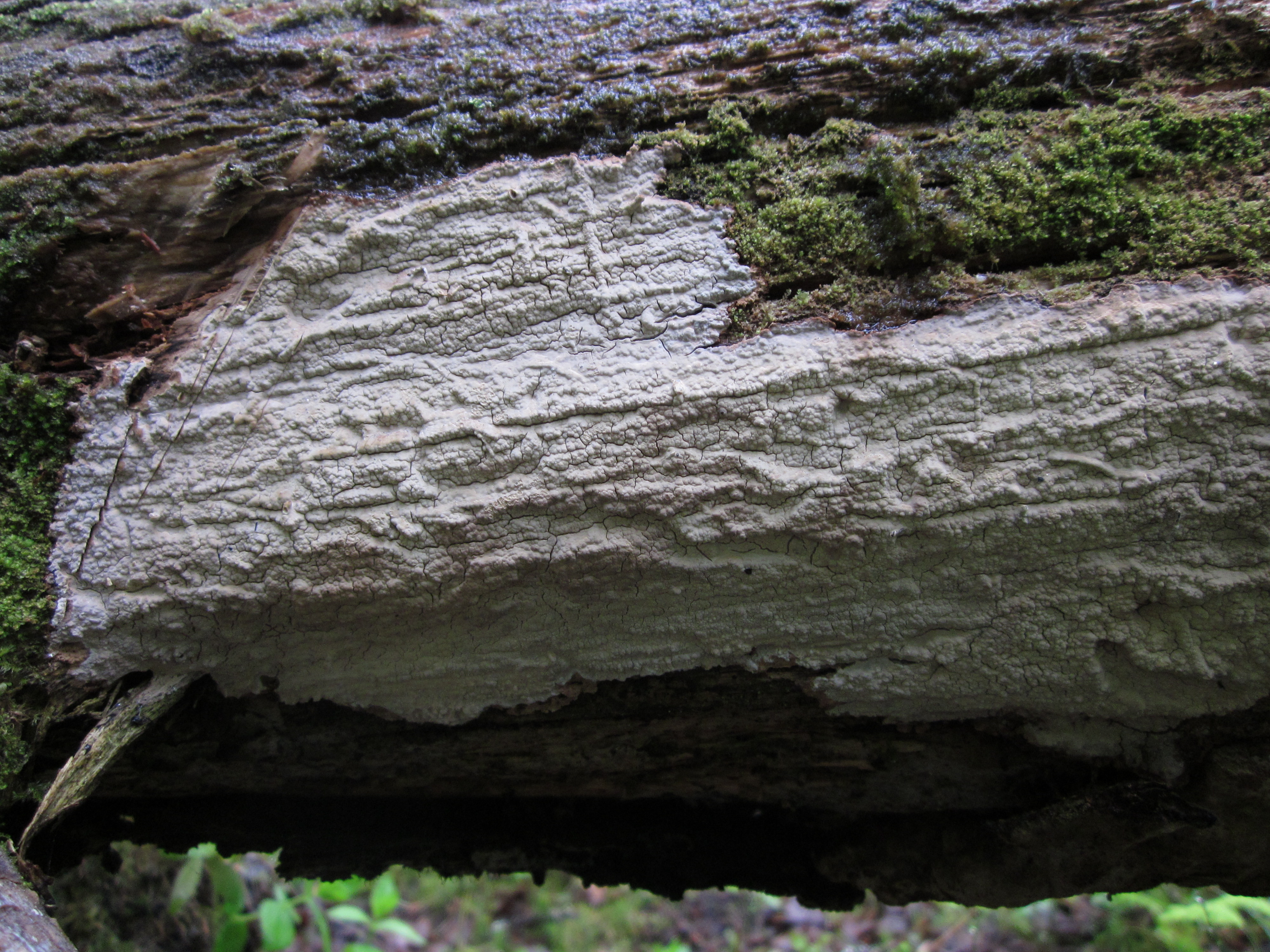

Scientific classification
- Domain: Eukaryota
- Kingdom: Fungi
- Division: Basidiomycota
- Class: Agaricomycetes
- Order: Agaricales
- Family: Cystostereaceae
- Genus: Cystostereum
- Species: C. murrayi

Binomial name
- Cystostereum murrayi (Berk. & M.A.Curtis) Pouzar

Synonyms
- Thelephora murraii Berk. & M.A.Curtis; Thelephora murrayi

= Cystostereum murrayi =

Species of fungus

Cystostereum murrayi is a species of fungus belonging to the family Cystostereaceae.

It has cosmopolitan distribution.

== Taxonomy ==
C. murrayi was first described as Thelophora murraii by Miles Joseph Berkeley and Moses Ashley Curtis in 1868. It was reordered to the genus Cystostereum by Pouzar in 1959.
