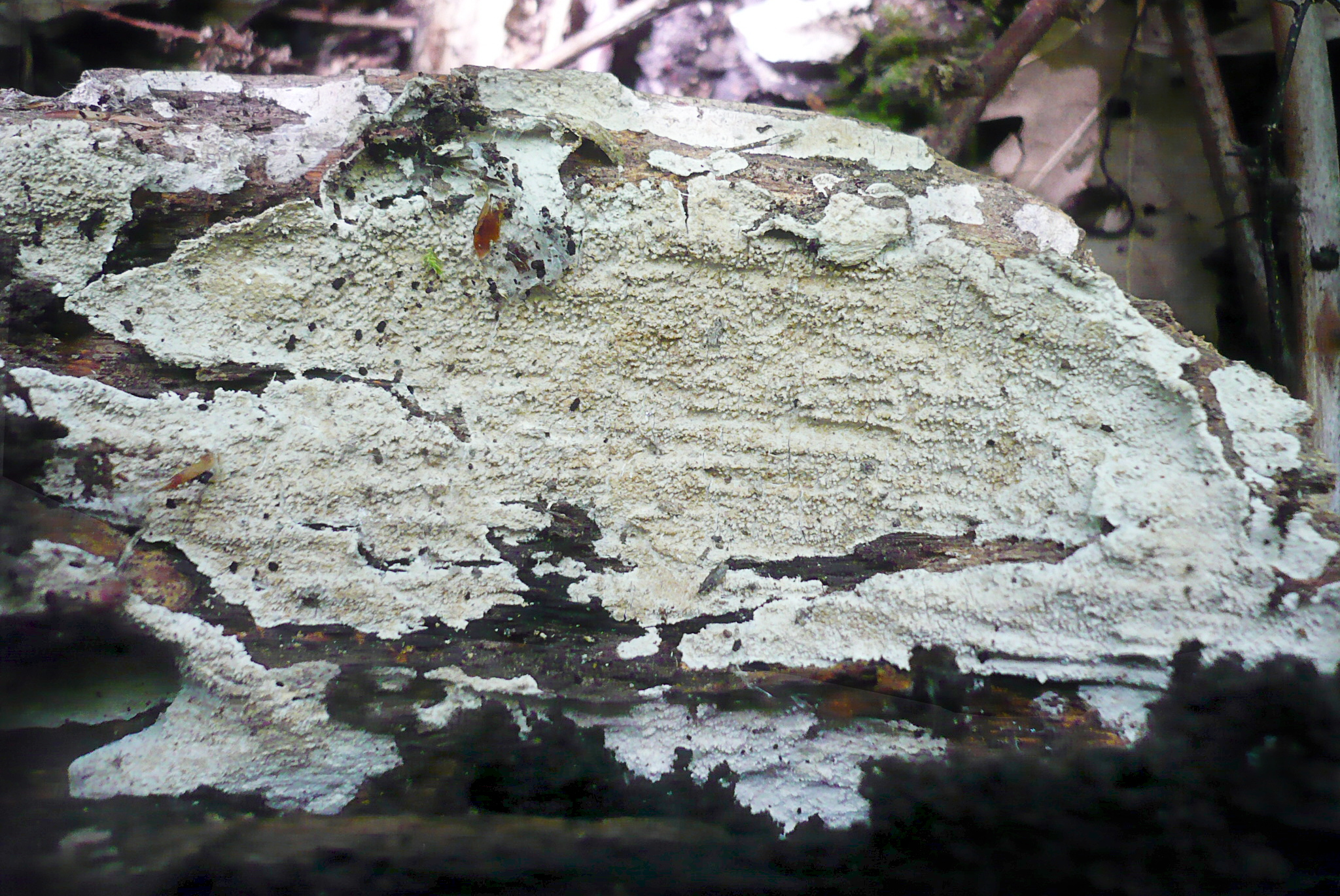
- Growing on aspen in Austria

Scientific classification
- Kingdom: Fungi
- Division: Basidiomycota
- Class: Agaricomycetes
- Order: Agaricales
- Family: Cystostereaceae
- Genus: Crustomyces
- Species: C. subabruptus

Binomial name
- Crustomyces subabruptus (Bourdot & Galzin) Jülich (1978)

Synonyms
- Odontia subabrupta Bourdot & Galzin (1928); Cystostereum subabruptum (Bourdot & Galzin) J.Erikss. & Ryvarden (1975); Cystostereum pini-canadense subsp. subabruptum (Bourdot & Galzin) Chamuris (1986); Crustomyces pini-canadensis subsp. subabruptus (Bourdot & Galzin) Ginns & M.N.L.Lefebvre (1993)

= Crustomyces subabruptus =

Species of fungus

Crustomyces subabruptus is a species of toothed crust fungus in the family Cystostereaceae.

== Taxonomy ==
The fungus was first described in 1928 by French mycologists Hubert Bourdot & Amédée Galzin in their 1938 work Hyménomycètes de France. They called it Odontia subabrupta, basing it on the similar species Odontia artocreas, a South American crust fungus originally described by Giacomo Bresadola in 1896. Swiss mycologist Walter Jülich transferred the fungus to the genus Crustomyces in 1978. George Chamuris suggested that the western North American Cystostereum pini-canadensis was the same species, proposing the new taxon C. pini-canadensis subspecies subabruptum.

== Description ==
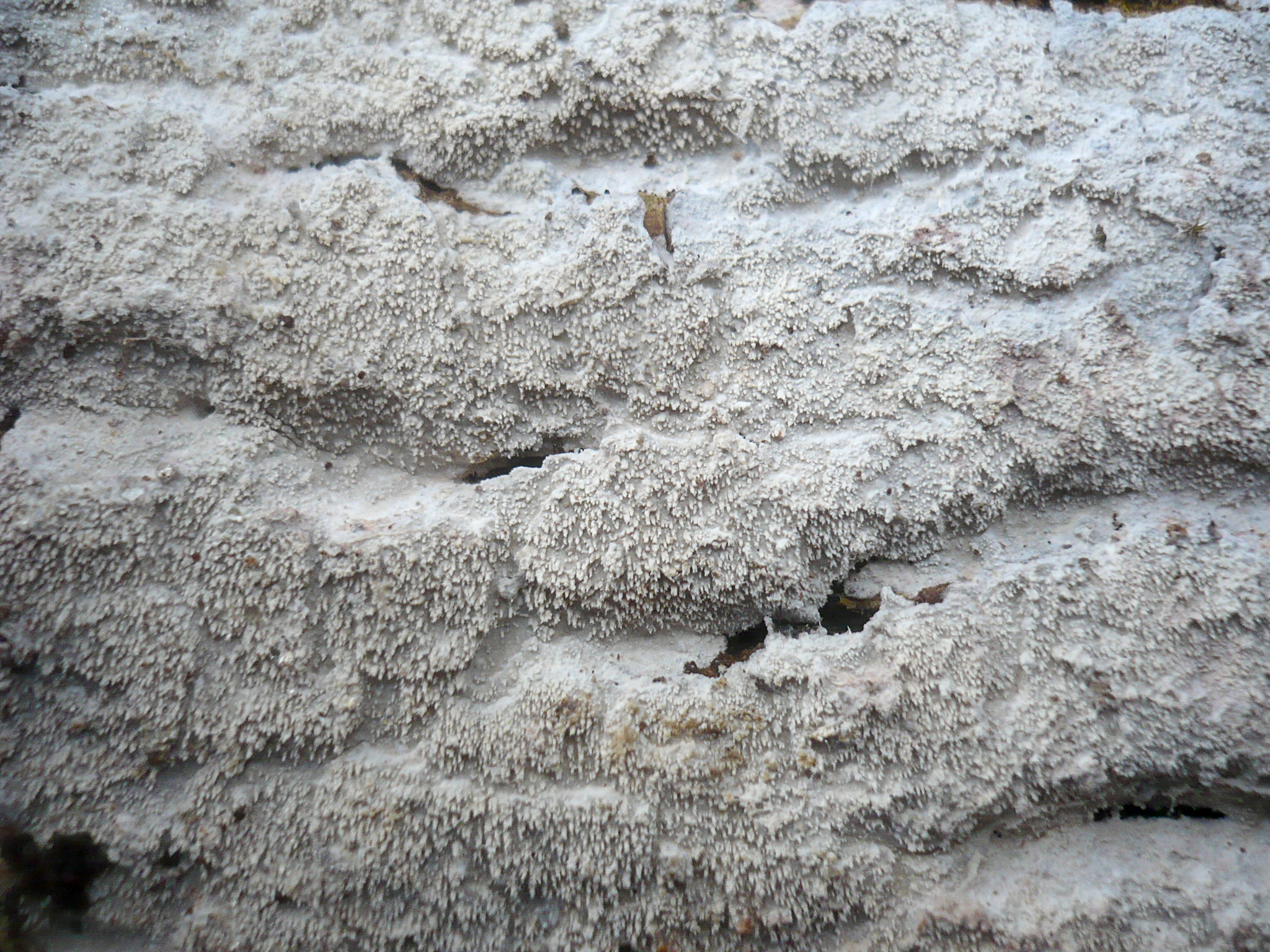
hymenial surface

The fruit body is crust like, initially with a leathery texture that later becomes more crusty. Its colour is whitish to pale yellowish. The spore-bearing surface (hymenium) is covered in densely crowded spines that are about 0.5 mm long. These vary in shape but are typically conical to more or less cylindrical. The margin of the crust is generally abrupt and distinct, especially in mature specimens. A drop of dilute potassium hydroxide placed on the hymenium gives it a yellowish colour.

The hyphal system of Crustomyces subabruptus is dimitic, consisting of two types of hyphae. The thin-walled generative hyphae are 2–3 μm wide, have clamps at their septa, and are highly branched. The thick-walled fibre-like skeletal hyphae are 2–3 μm wide, rarely have septa, and have very few clamps. The skeletal hyphae are mostly found in the subiculum next to the wood substrate.

The basidia are 12–18 by 3–4 μm, often somewhat constricted, with basal clamp and four sterigmata. Spores are ellipsoid, measuring 3.5–4.5 by 2–2.5 μm, smooth, non-amyloid.

== Habitat and distribution ==
Crustomyces subabruptus is a wood-decay fungus that grows on both deciduous and coniferous wood, typically occurring in dry and warm localities. It is widely distributed in Europe. In 2012 it was reported from Iran.
