= Parvobasidium =

Scientific classification
- Kingdom: Fungi
- Division: Basidiomycota
- Class: Agaricomycetes
- Order: Agaricales
- Family: Cystostereaceae
- Genus: Parvobasidium; Jülich (1975)

Type species
- Parvobasidium cretatum (Bourdot & Galzin) Jülich (1975)

Species
- P. cretatum P. lianicola

Genus of fungi

Parvobasidium is a genus of two species of crust fungi in the family Cystostereaceae.
