= Cericium =

Scientific classification
- Kingdom: Fungi
- Division: Basidiomycota
- Class: Agaricomycetes
- Order: Agaricales
- Family: Cystostereaceae
- Genus: Cericium; Hjortstam (1995)

Type species
- Cericium luteoincrustatum (Hjortstam & Ryvarden) Hjortstam (1995)

Synonyms
- Amethicium luteoincrustatum Hjortstam & Ryvarden (1986)

Genus of fungi

Cericium is a fungal genus in the family Cystostereaceae. It is a monotypic genus with the single species Cericium luteoincrustatum, a crust fungus. This species was originally described in 1986 by Kurt Hjortstam and Leif Ryvarden, who called it Amethicium luteoincrustatum. They placed it in the genus Amethicium based on microscopic similarities with the African species Amethicium rimosum.

== Description ==
Cericium luteoincrustatum is a waxy and brittle crust fungus with a fruit body that is about 0.2–1 mm thick. Its surface is either smooth or somewhat tuberculate with a pale yellow colour. It has a dimitic hyphal system, without clamp connections in the generative hyphae. The hyphae in the subiculum are arboriform (tree-like); these are binding-type hyphae. Cystidia feature yellowish incrustations at their bases. The spores produced by the fungus are smooth and thin-walled with an ellipsoid shape, and measure about 5 by 3 μm.

== Habitat and distribution ==
The holotype of Cericium luteoincrustatum was found in Iguazú National Park, Misiones Province, Argentina.
