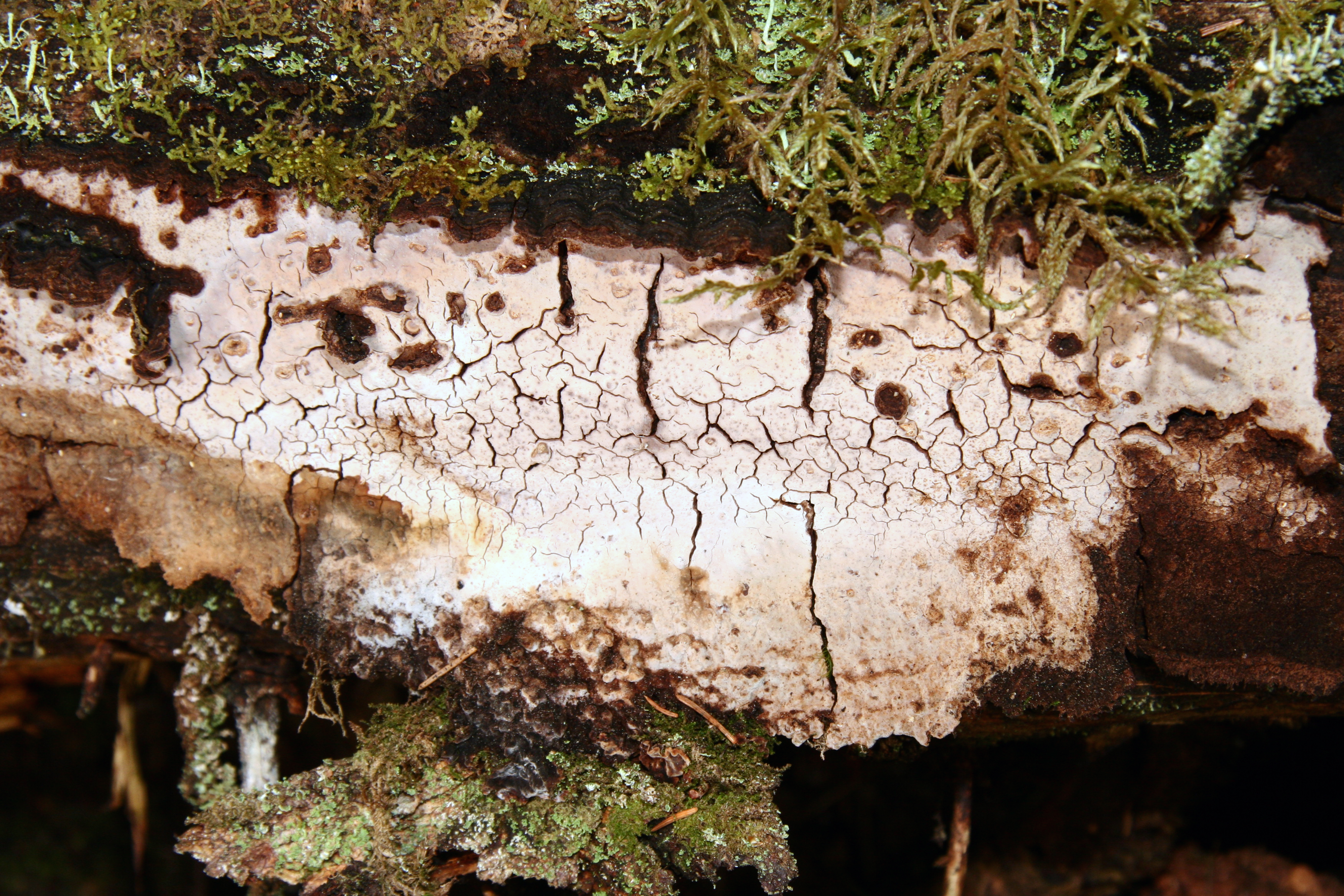
- Cystostereum murrayi

Scientific classification
- Kingdom: Fungi
- Division: Basidiomycota
- Class: Agaricomycetes
- Order: Agaricales
- Family: Cystostereaceae
- Genus: Cystostereum; Pouzar (1959)

Type species
- Cystostereum murrayi (Berk. & M.A.Curtis) Pouzar (1959)

Species
- C. australe C. heteromorphum C. kenyense C. murrayi C. pini-canadense C. saxitas C. stratosum

= Cystostereum =

Genus of fungi

Cystostereum is a genus of crust fungi in the family Cystostereaceae. The generic name combines the Greek word κύστις ("bladder") with Stereum.

== Species ==
- Cystostereum australe Nakasone (1983) – Southeastern USA; Costa Rica
- Cystostereum heteromorphum Hallenb. (1980) – Iran
- Cystostereum kenyense Hjortstam (1987) – Kenya
- Cystostereum murrayi (Berk. & M.A.Curtis) Pouzar (1959)
- Cystostereum pini-canadense (Schwein.) Parmasto (1968)
- Cystostereum saxitas (Burt) A.L.Welden (2010)
- Cystostereum stratosum Hallenb. (1978) – Iran; India
