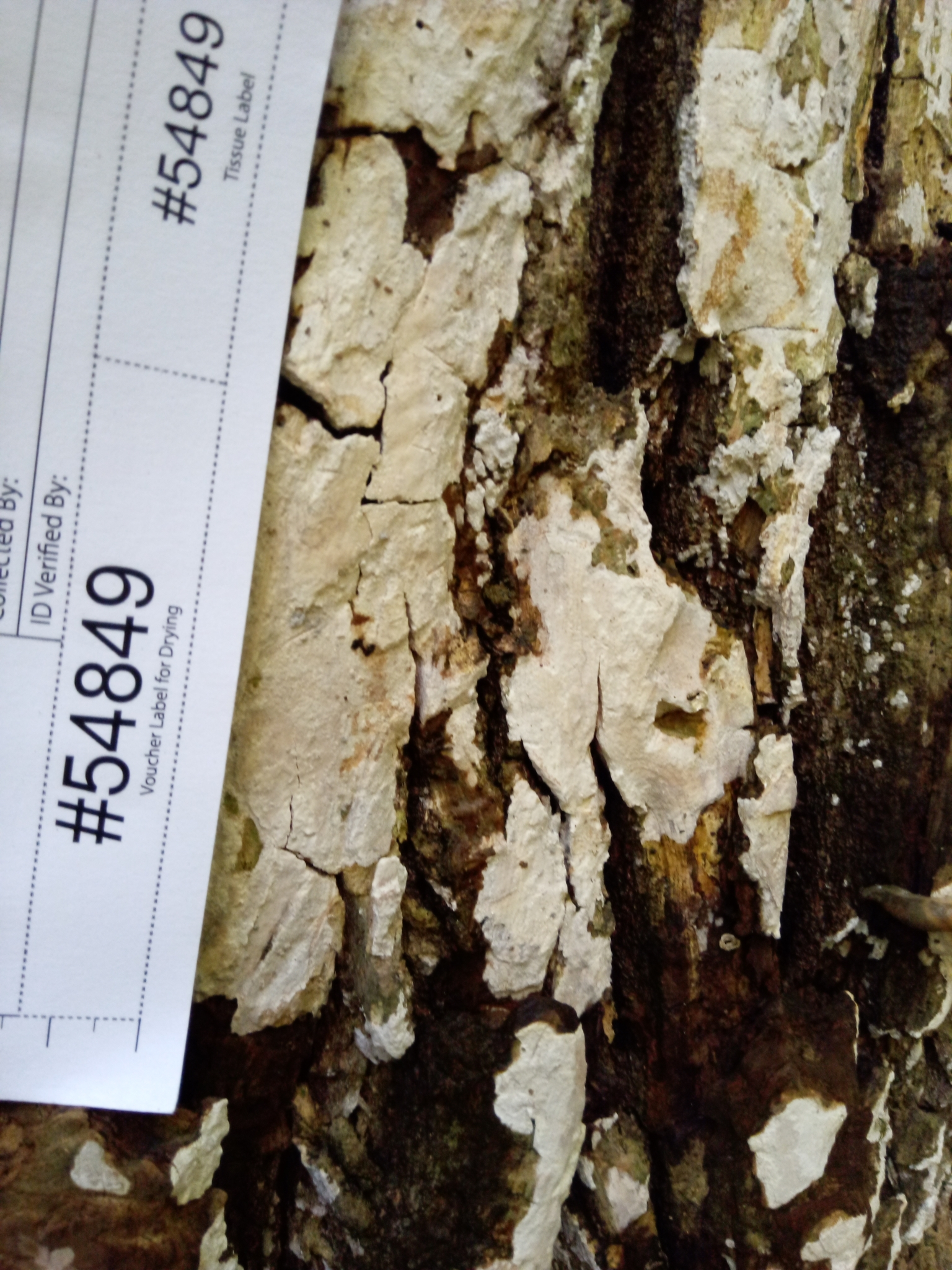

Scientific classification
- Domain: Eukaryota
- Kingdom: Fungi
- Division: Basidiomycota
- Class: Agaricomycetes
- Order: Agaricales
- Family: Cystostereaceae
- Genus: Cystidiodontia; Hjortstam (1983)

Type species
- Cystidiodontia artocreas (Berk. & M.A.Curtis ex Cooke) Hjortstam (1983)

Species
- C. artocreas; C. isabellina; C. laminifera

= Cystidiodontia =

Genus of fungi

Cystidiodontia is a genus of toothed crust fungi in the family Cystostereaceae.
