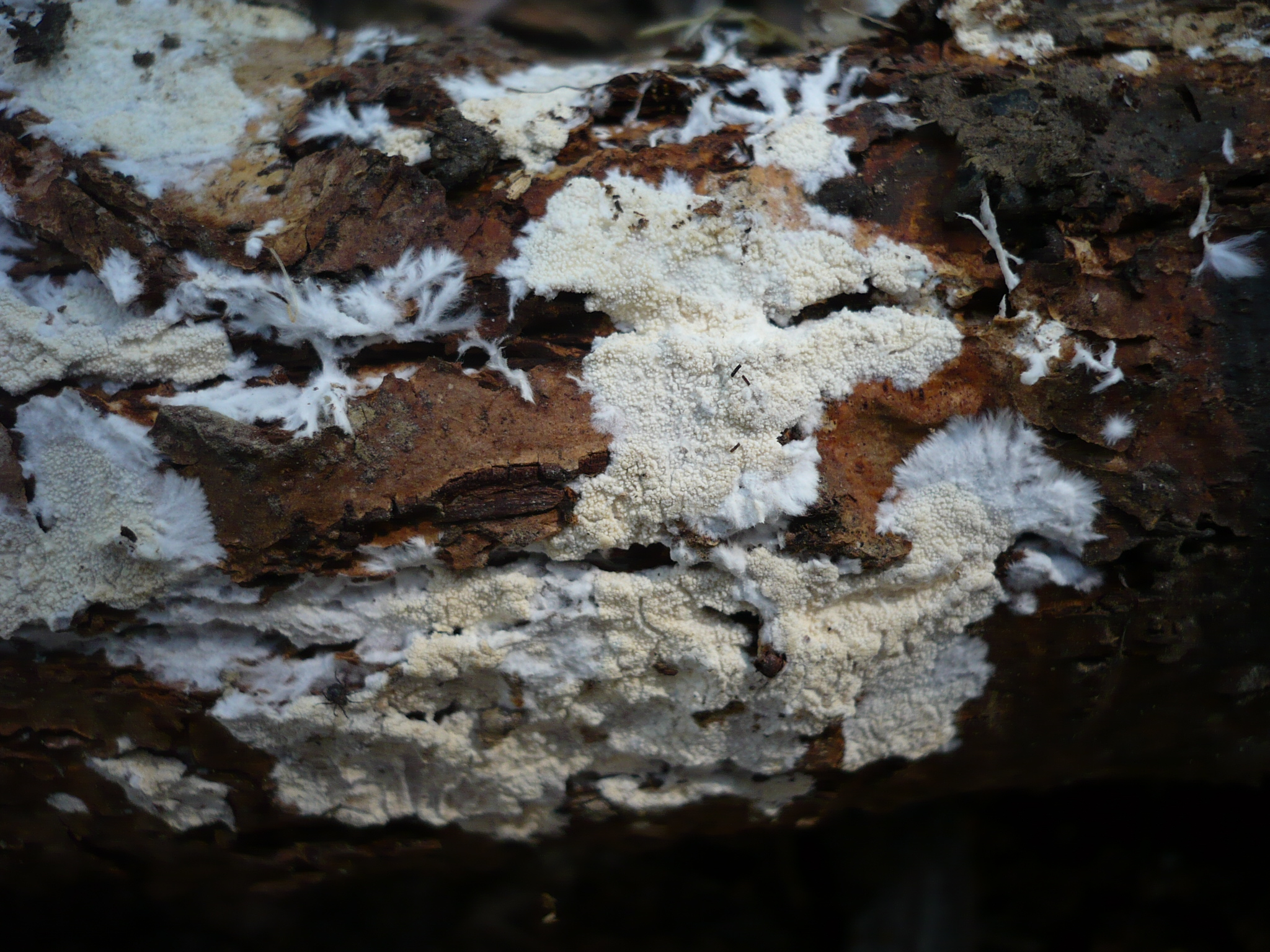
- Crustomyces subabruptus

Scientific classification
- Kingdom: Fungi
- Division: Basidiomycota
- Class: Agaricomycetes
- Order: Agaricales
- Family: Cystostereaceae
- Genus: Crustomyces; Jülich (1978)

Type species
- Crustomyces subabruptus (Bourdot & Galzin) Jülich (1978)

Species
- Crustomyces expallens Crustomyces indecorus Crustomyces subabruptus

= Crustomyces =

Genus of fungi

Crustomyces is a genus of fungi in the family Cystostereaceae. The widespread genus contains three species.
