= Amethicium =

Scientific classification
- Kingdom: Fungi
- Division: Basidiomycota
- Class: Agaricomycetes
- Order: Polyporales
- Family: Phanerochaetaceae
- Genus: Amethicium; Hjortstam (1983)

Type species
- Amethicium rimosum Hjortstam (1983)

Genus of fungi

Amethicium is a fungal genus in the family Phanerochaetaceae. A monotypic genus, it contains the single species Amethicium rimosum, a crust fungus first reported from Tanzania in 1983. Amethicium is primarily characterized by its purple fruit body and a dimitic hyphal system (two types of hyphae: generative and skeletal). The felt-like tissue layer covering the substrate (the subiculum) comprises a thin layer of densely intertwined skeletal hyphae.

== Taxonomy ==
Amethicium rimosum was described scientifically by Swedish mycologist Kurt Hjortstam in 1983, based on collections made by Leif Ryvarden a decade earlier. The type locality was on the southern slopes of Mount Kilimanjaro in Tanzania, at an elevation between 1,800 and 2,300 metres (5,900 and 7,500 ft).

There have been a few species formerly classified in the Amethicium that have since been transferred to other genera. Amethicium chrysocreas (Berk. & M.A. Curtis) Sheng H. Wu 1990, and Amethicium leoninum (Burds. & Nakasone) Sheng H. Wu 1990, are now in Crustodontia and Hyphoderma, respectively. Amethicium luteoincrustatum Hjortstam & Ryvarden 1986 is now classified as a member of Cericium.

== Description ==
Fruit bodies of Amethicium rimosum form soft, thin (about 200–300 μm thick) smooth crust that is closely attached to the surface of its substrate. Its colour is initially bluish or purplish, but tends to become greyish with less pronounced bluish tints in age. The hyphal system is dimitic, meaning that it contains both generative hyphae and skeletal hyphae. The highly-branched, intertwined basal hyphae—reminiscent of the morphologically similar binding hyphae—form a dense tissue. They are thin to moderately thick-walled, simple septate, and indextrinoid. Subhymenial hyphae (found in the tissue layer beneath the hymenium) are densely arranged, short-celled, thin-walled, and have clamp connections. Cystidia are absent from the hymenium. Basidia are terminal, roughly club shaped, fairly small (25 by 4–4.5 μm), and have four sterigmata. Spores are thin-walled, smooth, and hyaline (translucent). The spores, which are both inamyloid and indextrinoid, have dimensions of 3.5–4 by 1.75–2 μm.
