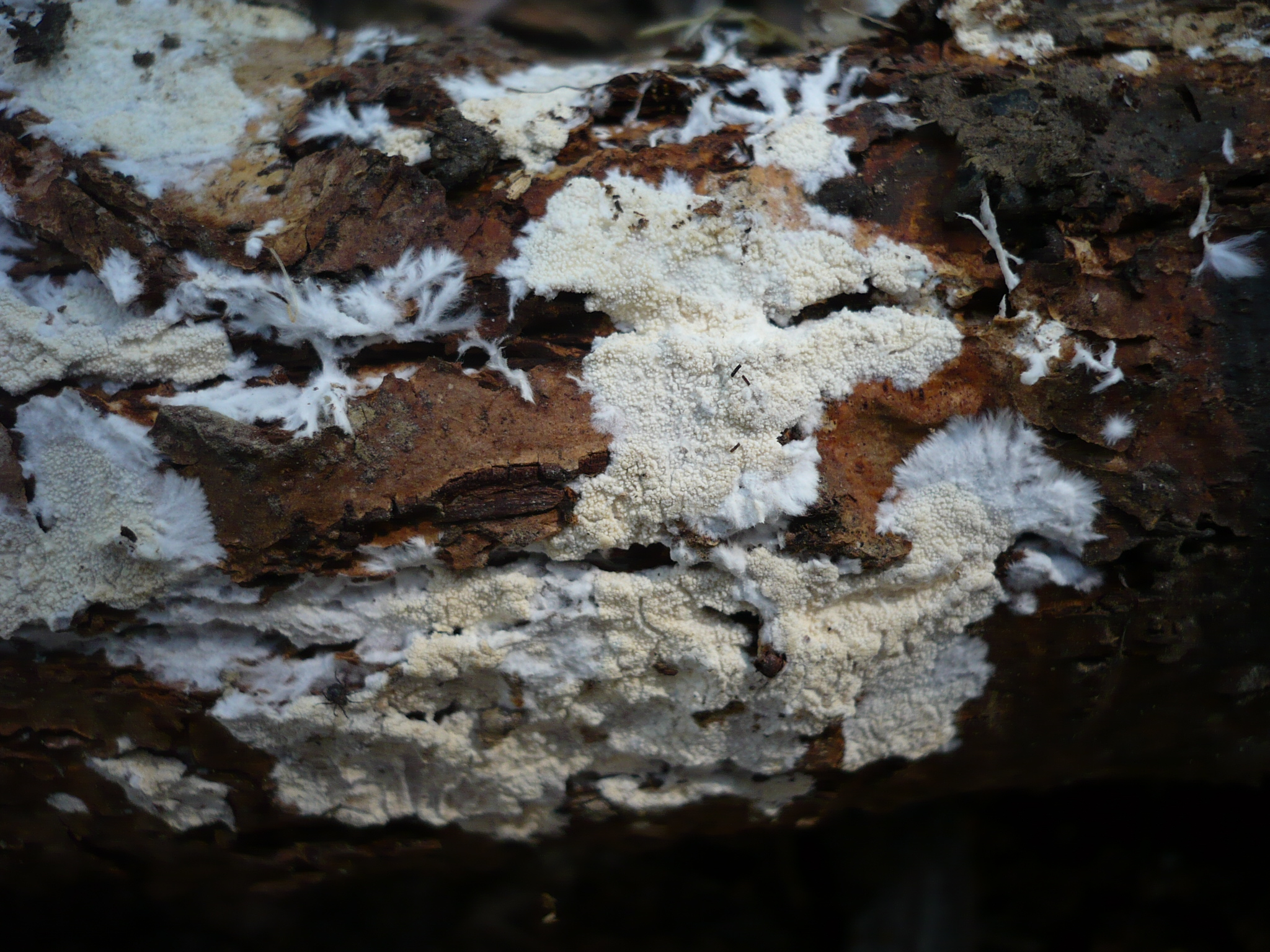
- Crustomyces subabruptus

Scientific classification
- Kingdom: Fungi
- Division: Basidiomycota
- Class: Agaricomycetes
- Order: Agaricales
- Family: Cystostereaceae; Jülich (1982)

Type genus
- Cystostereum Pouzar (1959)

Genera
- Cericium; Crustomyces; Cystidiodontia; Cystostereum; Parvobasidium; Parvodontia

= Cystostereaceae =

Family of fungi

The Cystostereaceae are a family of fungi in the order Agaricales. The family was circumscribed by Swiss mycologist Walter Jülich in 1982. As of April 2018, Index Fungorum accepts 6 genera and 18 species in the family.
