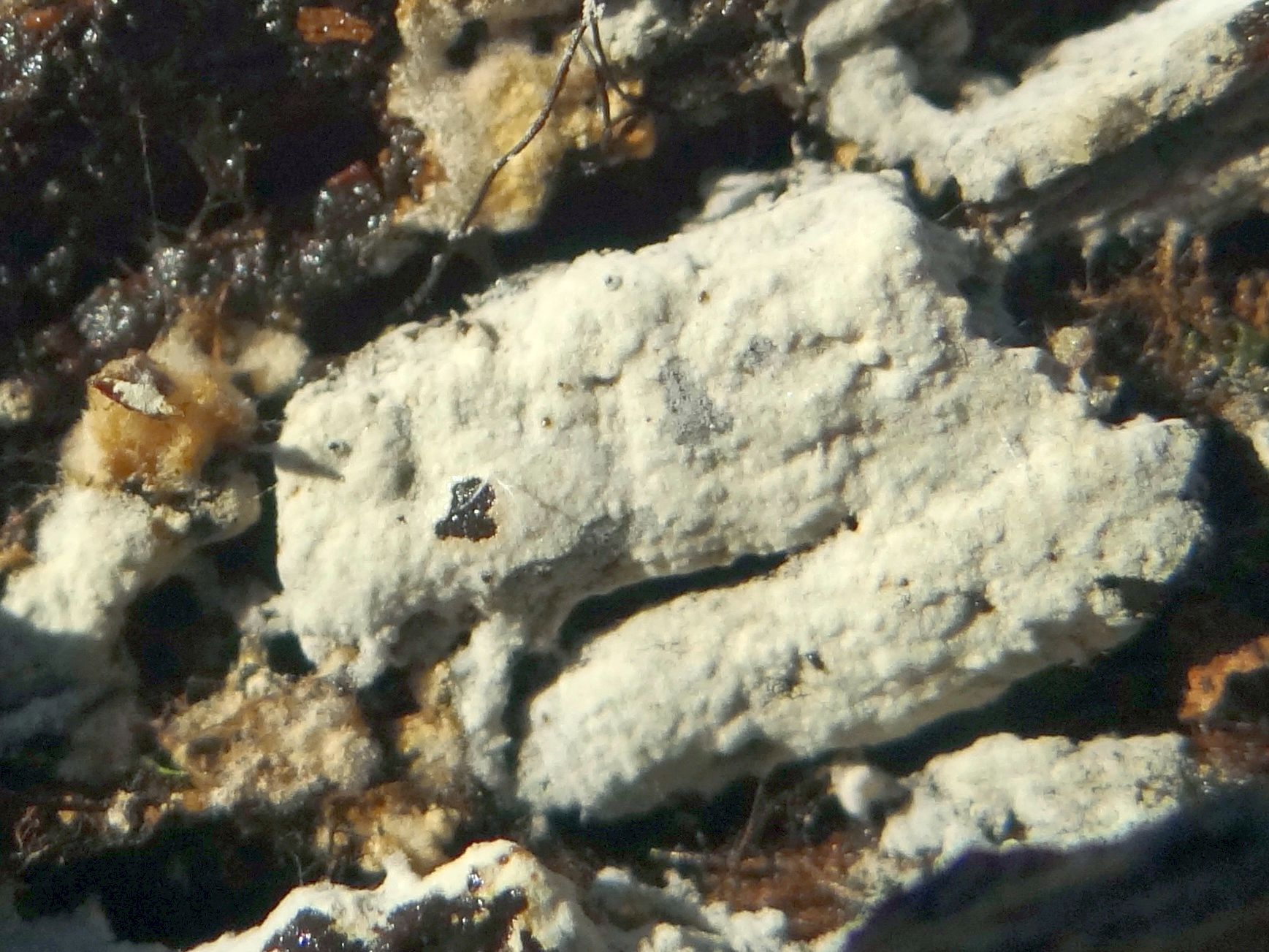
- Aphanobasidium pseudotsugae on Pinus sylvestris

Scientific classification
- Kingdom: Fungi
- Division: Basidiomycota
- Class: Agaricomycetes
- Order: Agaricales
- Family: Radulomycetaceae
- Genus: Aphanobasidium; Jülich (1979)

Type species
- Aphanobasidium subnitens (Bourdot & Galzin) Jülich

= Aphanobasidium =

Genus of fungi

Aphanobasidium is a genus of corticioid or crust fungi in the Radulomycetaceae family. The genus has a widespread distribution and contains several species. This genus was formally considered to be part of the Pterulaceae family.

A major reclassification of the Pterulaceae family occurred in 2020 and the genera Aphanobasidium, Radulomyces and Radulotubus were moved to a new family, Radulomycetaceae by the mycologists Caio A. Leal-Dutra, Bryn Tjader Mason Dentinger and Gareth W. Griffith.

== Species ==
As of August 2022, Species Fungorum accepted 18 species of Aphanobasidium.

- Aphanobasidium acanthophoenicis
- Aphanobasidium albidum
- Aphanobasidium alpestre
- Aphanobasidium aurobisporum
- Aphanobasidium aurora
- Aphanobasidium biapiculatum
- Aphanobasidium bicorne
- Aphanobasidium bisterigmaticum
- Aphanobasidium bourdotii
- Aphanobasidium curvisporum
- Aphanobasidium filicinum
- Aphanobasidium gloeocystidiatum
- Aphanobasidium paludicola
- Aphanobasidium pseudotsugae
- Aphanobasidium rubi
- Aphanobasidium sphaerosporum
- Aphanobasidium subcalceum
- Aphanobasidium subnitens
