= Radulotubus =

Scientific classification
- Kingdom: Fungi
- Division: Basidiomycota
- Class: Agaricomycetes
- Order: Agaricales
- Family: Radulomycetaceae
- Genus: Radulotubus; Y.C. Dai, S.H. He & C.L. Zhao (2016)

Genus of fungi

Radulotubus is a monotypic genus of corticioid or crust fungi in the family Radulomycetaceae containing the single resupinate species Radulotubus resupinatus. This species was found in Yunnan province, China and formally classified in 2016. The specimen was found growing on the fallen trunk of an angiosperm. It was originally placed in the family Pterulaceae and noted to be closesly related with Aphanobasidium and Radulomyces.

A major reclassification of the Pterulaceae family occurred in 2020 and the genera Aphanobasidium, Radulomyces and Radulotubus were moved to a new family, Radulomycetaceae by the mycologists Caio A. Leal-Dutra, Bryn Tjader Mason Dentinger and Gareth W. Griffith.

== Etymology ==
Resupinatus refers to the resupinate fruiting bodies (upward facing gills which can be considered 'upside down').

== Species ==
Species in the genus include:

- Radulotubus resupinatus
