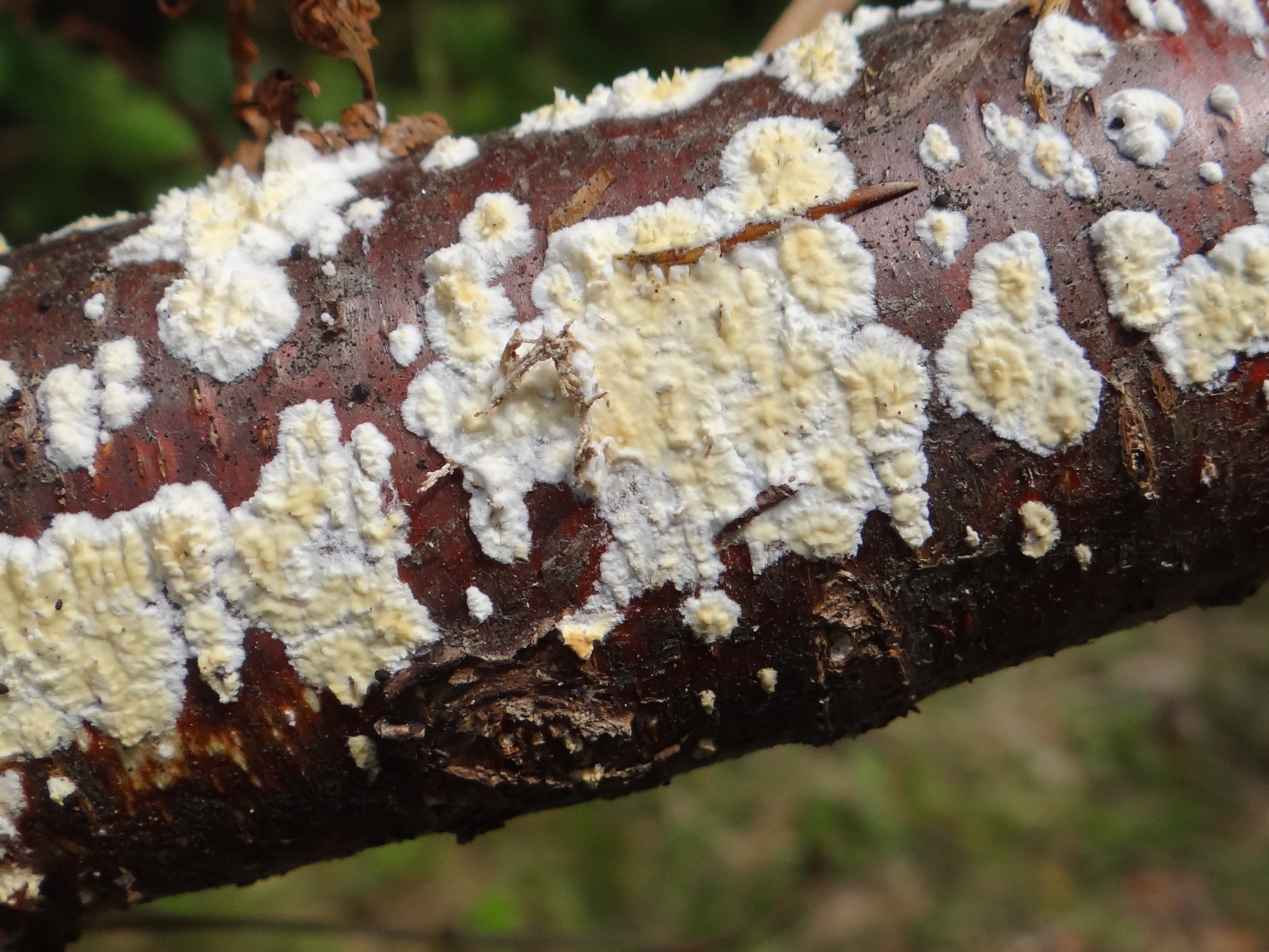
- Radulomyces confluens

Scientific classification
- Kingdom: Fungi
- Division: Basidiomycota
- Class: Agaricomycetes
- Order: Agaricales
- Family: Radulomycetaceae
- Genus: Radulomyces; M.P.Christ. (1960)

Type species
- Radulomyces confluens (Fr.) M.P.Christ. (1960)

= Radulomyces =

Genus of fungi

Radulomyces is a genus of crust fungi in the family Radulomycetaceae. The genus has a widespread distribution and contains 11 species. It was circumscribed by Danish botanist Mads Peter Christiansen in 1960, with Radulomyces confluens as the type species. This genus was formally considered to be part of the Pterulaceae family.

A major reclassification of the Pterulaceae family occurred in 2020 and the genera Aphanobasidium, Radulomyces and Radulotubus were moved to a new family, Radulomycetaceae by the mycologists Caio A. Leal-Dutra, Bryn Tjader Mason Dentinger and Gareth W. Griffith.

== Species ==
- Radulomyces arborifer
- Radulomyces confluens
- Radulomyces copelandii
- Radulomyces fuscus
- Radulomyces kamaainus
- Radulomyces licentii
- Radulomyces molaris
- Radulomyces notabilis
- Radulomyces paumanokensis
- Radulomyces poni
- Radulomyces probatus
- Radulomyces repandus
- Radulomyces rickii
- Radulomyces subsigmoideus
- Radulomyces tantalusensis
