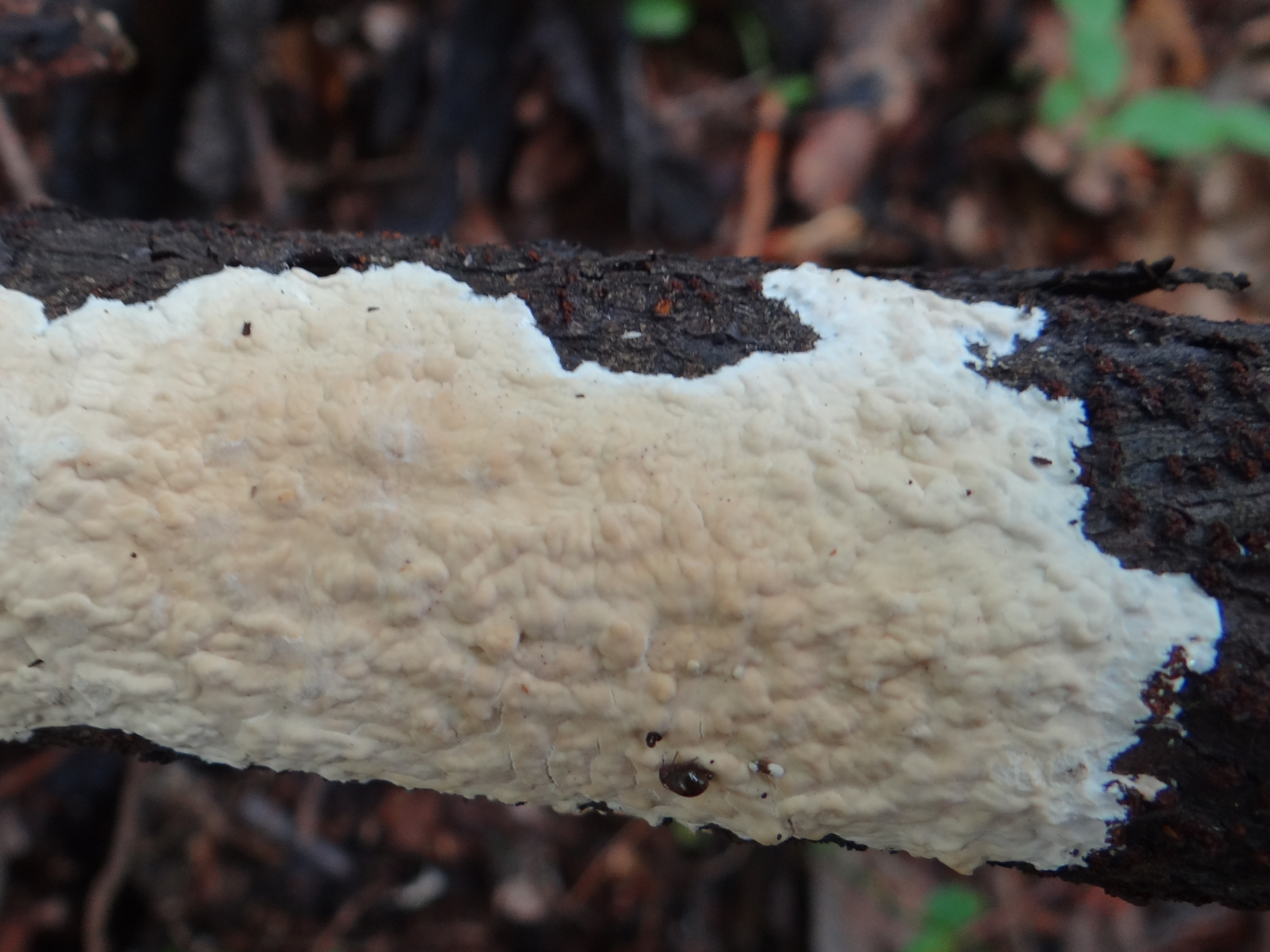
- Radulomyces confluens

Scientific classification
- Kingdom: Fungi
- Division: Basidiomycota
- Class: Agaricomycetes
- Order: Agaricales
- Family: Radulomycetaceae; Leal-Dutra, Dentinger & G.W.Griff (2020)

Type genus
- Radulomyces M.P.Christ. (1960)

Genera
- Aphanobasidium; Radulomyces; Radulotubus

= Radulomycetaceae =

Family of fungi

The Radulomycetaceae are a family of fungi in the order Agaricales.

The family was introduced in 2020 based on phylogenetic analysis and incorporates the genera Aphanobasidium, Radulomyces and Radulotubus.

== Taxonomy ==
Radulomycetaceae was circumscribed by the mycologists Caio A. Leal-Dutra, Bryn Tjader Mason Dentinger and Gareth W. Griffith in 2020.

== Etymology ==
the family name Radulomycetaceae is derived from the name of the type genus, Radulomyces.

== See also ==
- List of Agaricales families
