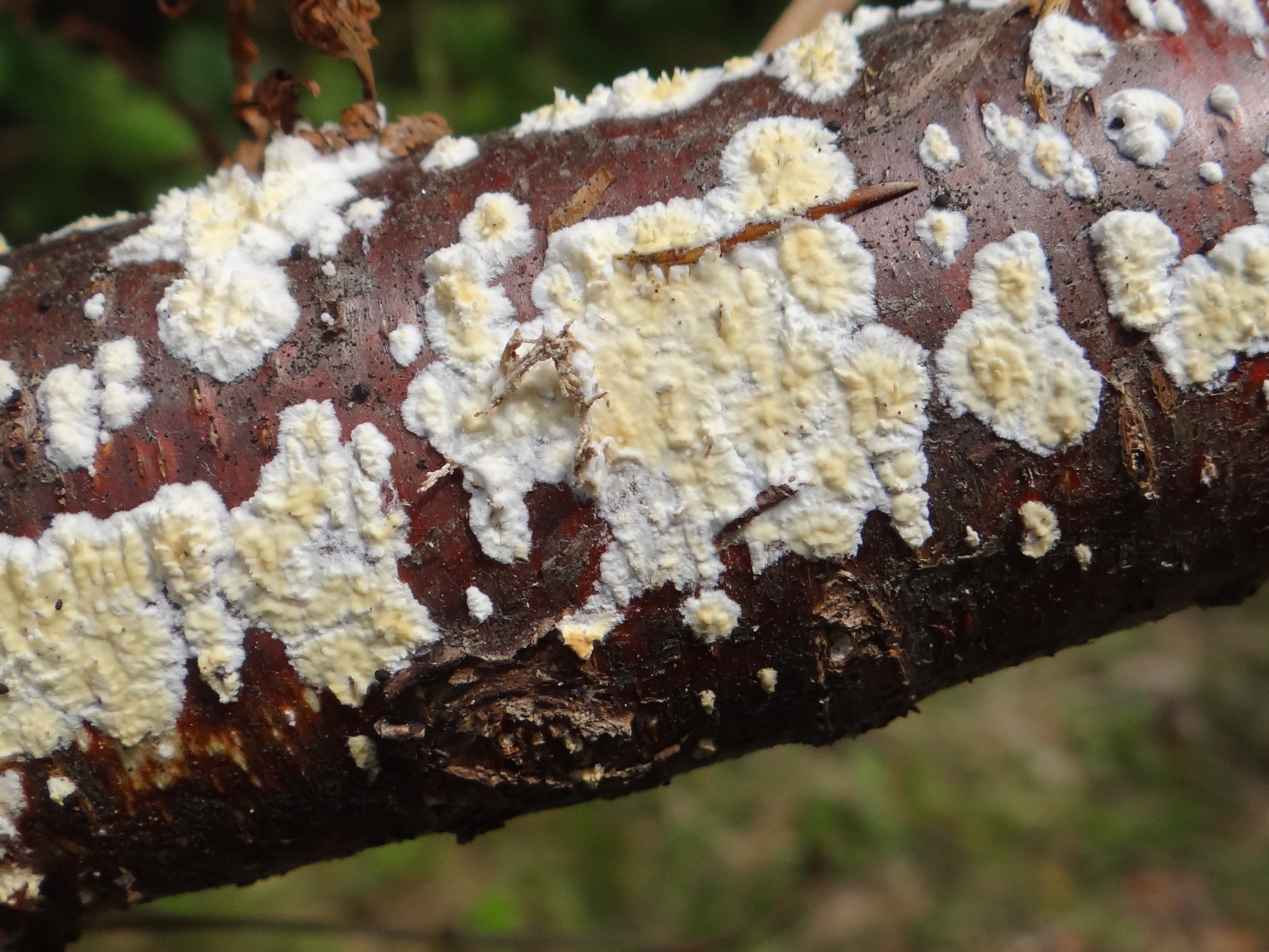

Scientific classification
- Kingdom: Fungi
- Division: Basidiomycota
- Class: Agaricomycetes
- Order: Agaricales
- Family: Radulomycetaceae
- Genus: Radulomyces
- Species: R. confluens

Binomial name
- Radulomyces confluens (Fr.) M.P.Christ. (1960)

Synonyms
- Thelephora confluens Fr. (1815)

= Radulomyces confluens =

Species of fungus

Radulomyces confluens is a species of crust fungus in the family Pterulaceae. It was originally described in 1815 by Elias Magnus Fries with the name Thelephora confluens. Danish botanist Mads Peter Christiansen made it the type species of his newly-circumscribed genus Radulomyces in 1960.
