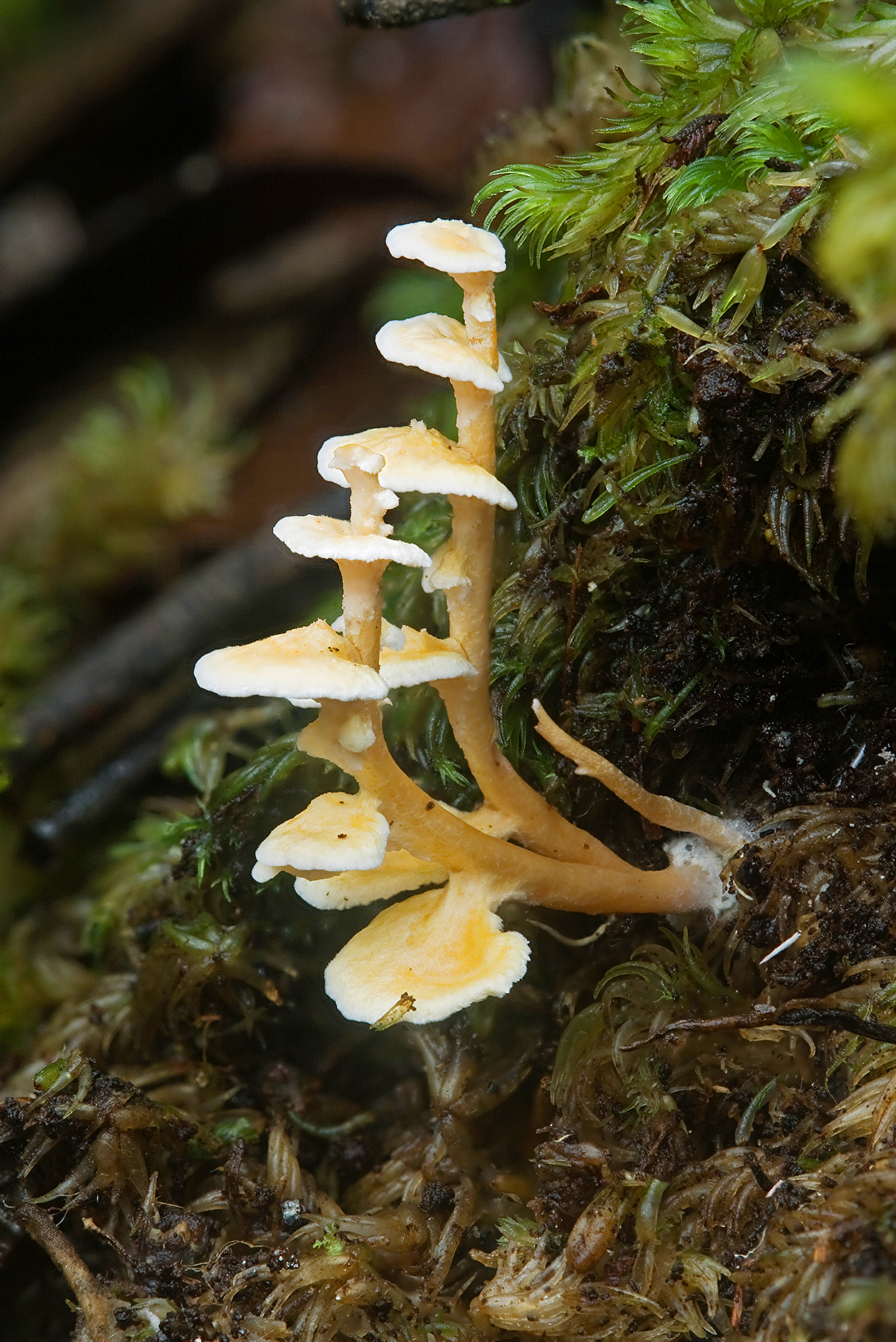
- Podoserpula pusio Tasmania, Australia

Scientific classification
- Kingdom: Fungi
- Division: Basidiomycota
- Class: Agaricomycetes
- Order: Amylocorticiales
- Family: Amylocorticiaceae
- Genus: Podoserpula; D.A.Reid (1963)

Type species
- Podoserpula pusio (Berk.) D.A.Reid (1963)

Species
- P. ailaoshanensis; P. aliweni; P. insignis; P. miranda; P. pusio; P. tristis

= Podoserpula =

Genus of fungi

Podoserpula is a genus of fungi in the family Amylocorticiaceae. The genus contains six species including the type species, P. pusio, commonly known as the pagoda fungus. Species of the genus Podoserpula produce fruit bodies consisting of up to a dozen caps arranged in overlapping shelves, attached to a central axis. Its unique shape is not known to exist in any other fungi. The genus is known to occur in Australia and New Zealand, Venezuela, Madagascar, and New Caledonia.

== Taxonomy and phylogeny ==
Craterellus pusio was first described by Miles Joseph Berkeley in an 1859 publication by Joseph Hooker. Otto Kuntze transferred it to the genus Merulius in 1891. Until the 1960s, however, it was known as Craterellus multiplex, a species described by Mordecai Cubitt Cooke and George Edward Massee in 1889, and moved to Cantharellus by Curtis Gates Lloyd in 1920. In 1958, British mycologist R.W.G. Dennis collected the species in Venezuela during an expedition financed by the Percy Sladen Memorial Trust. Derek Reid, attempting to identify the species, rediscovered Berkeley's name, which had priority, and described the new genus Podoserpula for it in 1963.

Reid considered the genus allied to Leucogyrophana, then thought to belong to the family Coniophoraceae. Marinus Anton Donk, in a monograph published the next year, agreed and placed it close to Serpula and Coniophora; these genera are now known to represent early-diverging lineages in the order Boletales. However, the white spore print and small, smooth, and hyaline spores are not characteristic of species in the Coniophoraceae. In a large-scale phylogenetic analysis published in 2006, Podoserpula nested far from them in the Plicaturopsis clade, an evolutionarily related group of early-diverging members of the order Agaricales. Other taxa in this clade include Plicaturopsis and Agroathelia. The entire clade was later separated into three smaller orders, Podoserpula becoming a member of the Amylocorticiales along with mostly corticioid genera such as Amylocorticium and Serpulomyces.

A new species, Podoserpula miranda, was proposed in 2009 by a group of New Caledonian mycologists for a species of that South Pacific archipelago. The name was provisional (not validly published), however, as the description was in French (the code of nomenclature mandates Latin) and lacked a required designation of a type specimen. It was validly published in 2013.

== Description ==
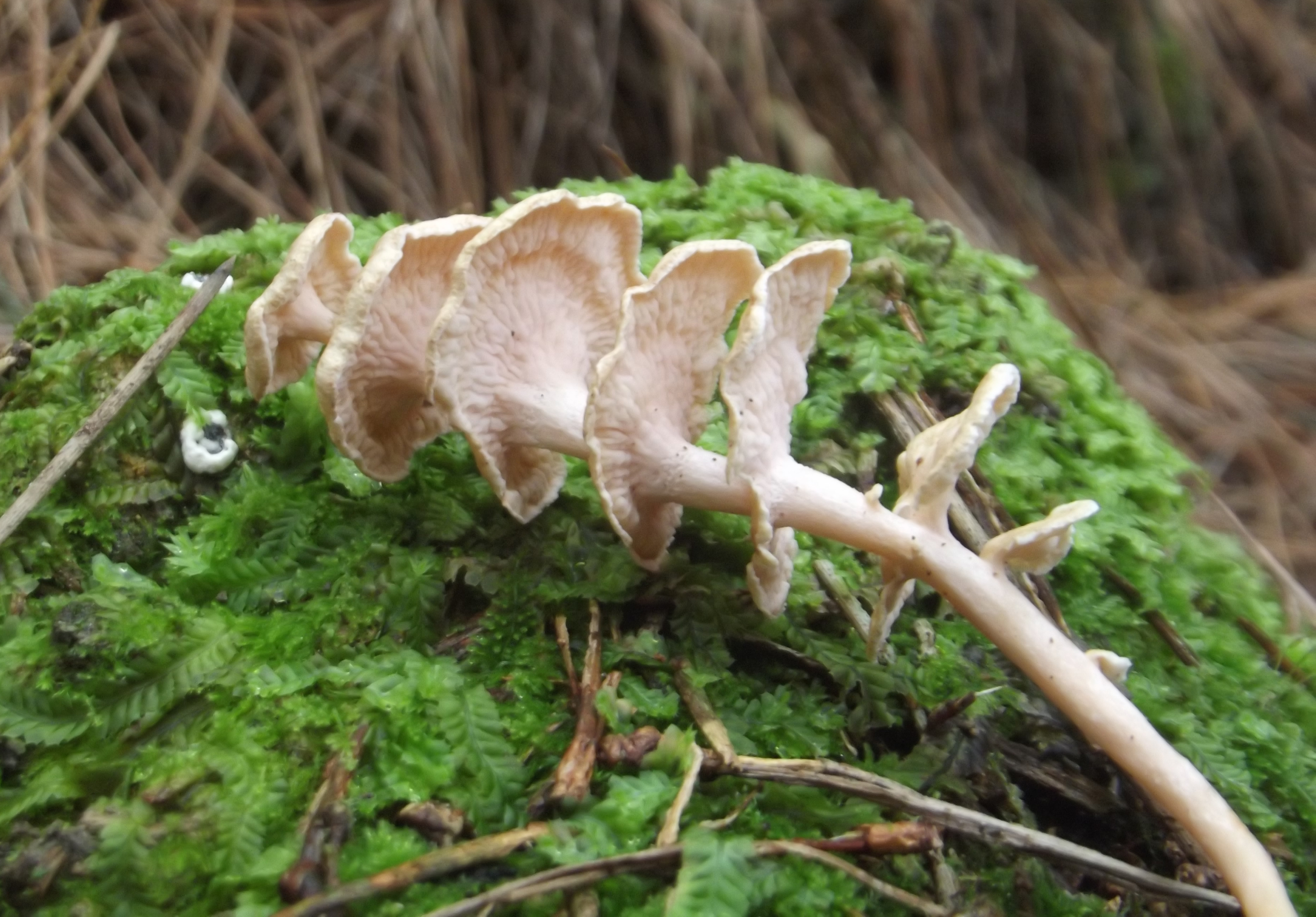
Podoserpula tristis, from New Zealand

The fruit bodies of Podoserpula species have an unusual form unknown in other fungi. The fruit bodies, which grow to a height of 1–18 cm (0.4–7.1 in), consist of up to a dozen cup-shaped (spathulate) to kidney-shaped (reniform) caps arranged in multiple tiers and attached to a central stem. Caps are joined to the main axis by short, flattened, stem-like attachments. The variety tristis, in contrast, has caps that are more circular and appear to be pierced either centrally or off to the side. The surface of the caps is smooth and often brightly colored. The hymenium (spore-bearing surface) on the underside of the caps is pink and has a folded and corrugated surface. Close to the area of attachment between the cap and the stem-like connection to the main axis are swellings resembling warts or blisters. Individual caps resemble somewhat those of the European species Plicaturopsis crispa.

Podoserpula has a monomitic hyphal structure, meaning that it only contains generative hyphae, which are relatively undifferentiated and can develop reproductive structures. These hyphae are thin-walled, hyaline (translucent), branched, and up to 10 μm thick. They have distinct, often swollen, clamp connections at the septa. The spores are small, typically 2.75–6 by 2–3.5 μm, smooth, hyaline, and vary in shape from roughly elliptical to somewhat spherical. The basidia (spore-bearing cells) can be either two- or four-spored, and are club shaped, with a clamp connection at the base. Podoserpula has neither cystidia nor gloeocystidia.

The fruiting bodies of Podoserpula pusio range from 7.5 cm (3.0 in) to 18 cm (7.1 in) tall. ellipsospora has elongated elliptical spores typically measuring 4–5 by 2.75–3.5 μm.

Podoserpula miranda grows to a height of 10 cm (3.9 in). It differs from P. pusio in having thinner flesh, up to six funnel-shaped caps whose size diminishes approaching the top, and a bright pink coloration in the folds of the hymenium.

== Habitat and distribution ==
The fruit bodies of Podoserpula pusio grow on the ground, on well-rotted stumps, or among decaying tussock grass. They are presumed to be saprobic, and obtain nutrients by breaking down larger organic molecules found in the soil or in decaying wood. P. miranda in contrast, is thought to be ectomycorrhizal, as it appears to associate with Arillastrum gummiferum, the predominant canopy tree in the forests where it is found.

Species of the genus Podoserpula have been reported from Australasia, Venezuela, Madagascar, and on the Falkland Islands.
