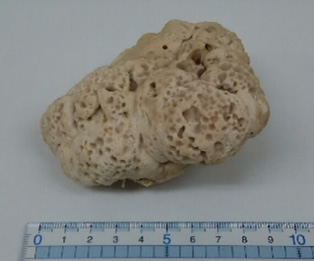
- Basidiomycetes-X (a hyphal mass)

Scientific classification
- Kingdom: Fungi
- Division: Basidiomycota
- Class: Agaricomycetes
- Order: Amylocorticiales
- Family: Amylocorticiaceae
- Genus: Ceraceomyces
- Species: C. tessulatus

Binomial name
- Ceraceomyces tessulatus

= Echigoshirayukidake (Basidiomycetes-X) =

Species of fungus

Echigoshirayukidake (Japanese: 越後白雪茸), commonly called Basidiomycetes-X or BDM-X, is a sclerotium of Ceraceomyces tessulatus. It is classified as a basidiomycete because of its beak-shaped processes (Clamp connections). It does not form basidia and only forms sclerotia (hyphal masses) when cultured. In these respects, BDM-X is distinguished from other basidiomycetes. BDM-X is cultured and consumed as an edible mushroom. The mushroom, Basidiomycetes-X (BDM-X), echigoshirayukidake was identified as Ceraceomyces tessulatus, a member of the family Amylocorticiaceae based on the molecular analysis of ITS region and D1/D2 regions of rDNA. Sequence similarity between the mushroom and Ceraceomyces tessulatus voucher KHL16429, Herb. O (ACCESSION KU518951) was 99% in ITS1 region and 99% in 26 or 28S rDNA D1/D2 regions respectively.

== Description ==
Basidiomycetes-X can be cultured by an ordinary method. A cultured strain or the seed of BDM-X can be aseptically inoculated into agar, liquid, or sawdust media with suitable nutrients, and is cultured under appropriate temperature conditions. The optimum growth conditions are at pH 5.0 to 6.0 and at 22 to 26°C.

BDM-X forms hyphal masses in light pink colonies crowded with hyphae on the media. These sometimes grow concentrically from the site of inoculation. If a group of hyphal masses is formed within the medium, they are interconnected by mycelial strands to form a large hyphal mass.

As the shape of BDM-X depends on the environment in which it is cultured, the large hyphal masses of BDM-X for industry use can be formed, for example, on a sawdust medium (10 cm×10 cm×20 cm) after one year cultivation.

== Gallery ==
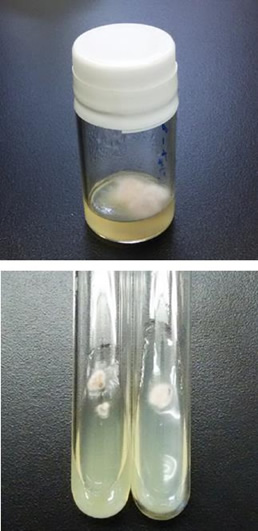
Hyphae of Basidiomycetes-X on an agar medium (upper, screw cap bottle; lower, test tube)

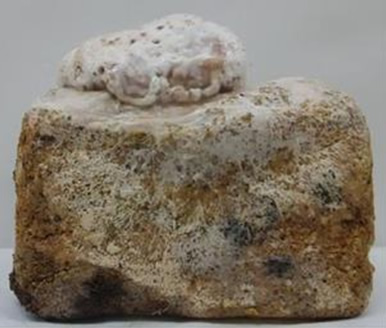
A large hyphal mass of BDM-X on a sawdust medium (10cm×10cm×20cm)
