= Podoserpula miranda =

Conservation status
- Critically Endangered (IUCN 3.1)

Scientific classification
- Kingdom: Fungi
- Division: Basidiomycota
- Class: Agaricomycetes
- Order: Amylocorticiales
- Family: Amylocorticiaceae
- Genus: Podoserpula
- Species: P. miranda

Binomial name
- Podoserpula miranda Buyck, Duhem, Eyssart & Ducousso 2012

Species of fungus

Podoserpula miranda is a rare species of fungus in the family Amylocorticiaceae. The common name for P. miranda is Barbie pagoda. Its specific epithet miranda, is Latin for "admirable." This is a reference to P. miranda's bright pink color. Found in New Caledonia, this species was described in 2012.

== Morphology ==
Podoserpula miranda's common name, Barbie pagoda fungus, is due to its brilliant pink color, similar to cotton candy. P. miranda has a multi-tiered appearance, possessing 3 to 6 pilei stacked one above the other which are separated by about one-half inch (about one cm) of stem between pilei, as opposed to having a single pileus like most other agaricoid fungi. The species reaches a height of four inches (ten centimeters). A distinguishing characteristic exhibited by species within the Amylocorticiales order is their clamped hyphae. The spores of P. miranda are globose and typically have a diameter between 3.5 and 5.5 micrometers.

== Distribution and habitat ==
=== Distribution ===
New Caledonia

Podoserpula miranda has a very limited geographical distribution. This species is endemic to a group of islands in the Pacific Ocean, called New Caledonia, which is a French territory. They are typically located on Grande Terre, the largest of the New Caledonia islands. This species has only been found in 5 sites within the southern half of Grande Terre, approximately 80 km apart. While the actual number of remaining P. miranda is unknown, the IUCN Red List suggests the number is between 80 and 240.

=== Habitat ===
Podoserpula miranda has very specific habitat requirements and only grows in approximately half of Grande Terre. This species can be found in forest soils, and is associated with Arillastrum gummiferum, commonly referred to as the Oak gum tree. Since it is only found in association with the Oak gum tree, scientists consider that P. miranda could be a parasitic organism, obtaining its necessary nutrients from this tree species to survive. Researcher Bart Buyck hypothesized that the highly metallic soils of New Caledonia may contribute to the signature bright pink pigment that is expressed in P. miranda.

== Conservation ==
=== Conservation status ===
As of July 7, 2019, Podoserpula miranda has been identified by the IUCN as a critically endangered species.

=== Threats to Podoserpula miranda ===
There are a range of factors contributing to the current conservation status of Podoserpula miranda. Some of these threats are climate related, such as fires, which cause destruction and damage to the habitat of P. miranda. Deforestation is a major contributor to the population decline of P. miranda. Deforestation has shrunk the area of land in New Caledonia that is habitable for P. miranda.

Other factors threatening P. miranda include predators. Feral pigs consume the mushrooms, shrinking the population even further. Other species, including Equus ferus (wild horse) and Bovini (wild cattle), have an impact on fungi populations as well, causing damage to the habitat by compressing and destroying the fungal mycelium. The limited geographical range of P. miranda causes it to be a very rare species. With an already small number of remaining individuals, the P. miranda population size continues to decrease due to these factors.

=== Conservation management ===
There are a few steps that can be taken to combat the population decline and avoid extinction of P. miranda. Currently, no efforts are being made in terms of conservation management to protect this species and its habitat. Some tangible conservation actions include educating and spreading awareness about the vital impact fungi have on ecosystem health and biodiversity. Including fungi species in the discussion of conservation management in general is also critical. Additionally, efforts to study and manage the feral pig populations in New Caledonia is important, as feral pigs significantly contribute to the depletion of this valuable ecosystem resource.

== Similar species ==
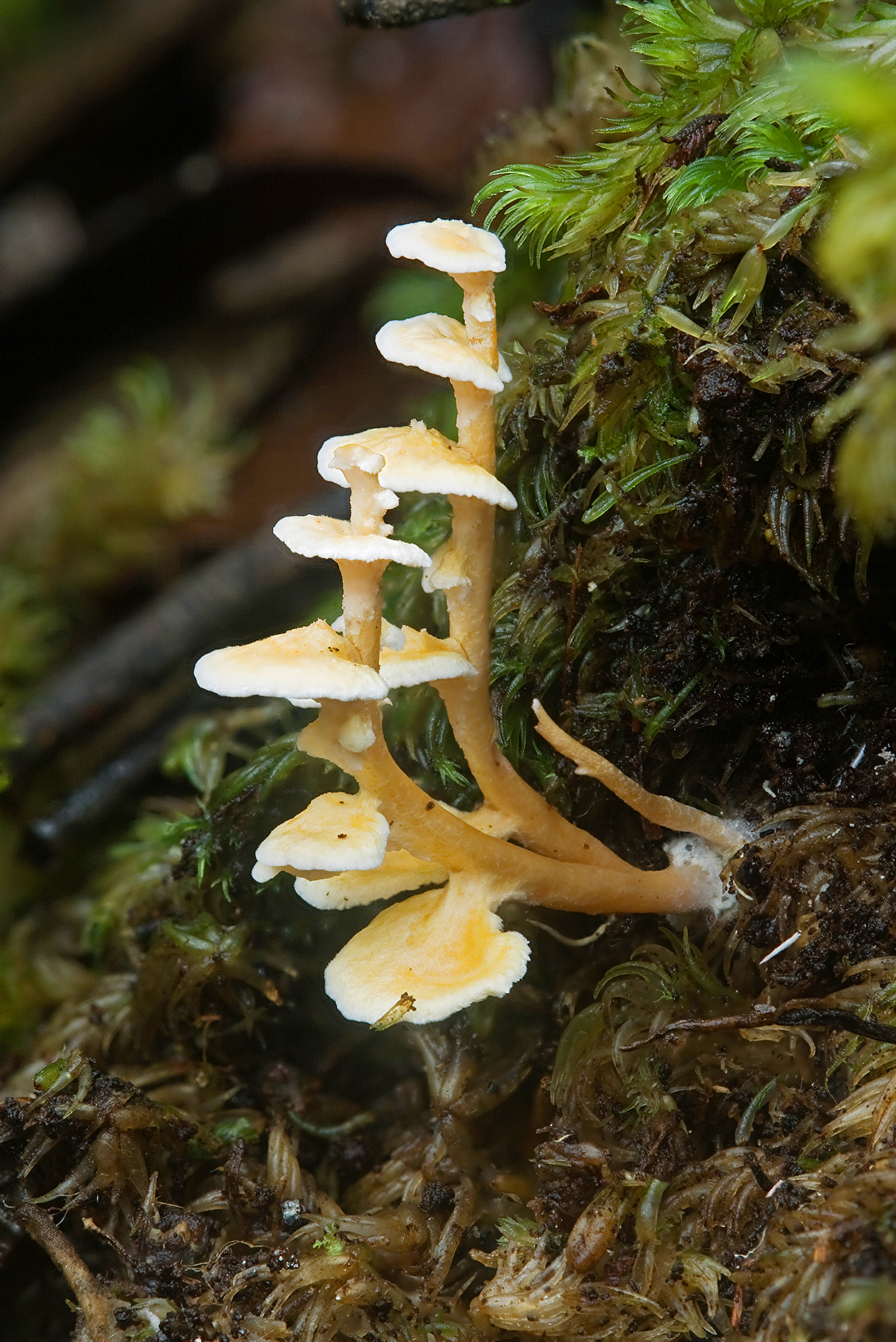
Podoserpula pusio

=== Podoserpula pusio ===
First collected in Tasmania in the 18th century, the fungi species Podoserpula pusio shares a remarkable resemblance to P. miranda. While both species share the same genius, some key characteristics distinguish them. The lack of incrustations on the hyphae, the limited geographical range, and the bright pink coloration observed in P. miranda, indicate that these represent two genetically distinct species. In addition to these traits, the separate classification of these two species is supported by sequencing data. P. pusio is described as cream or yellowish in color and is found in Australia.

=== Podoserpula aliweni ===
Another species closely related to P. miranda is Podoserpula aliweni. P. aliweni is found in Chile. This species is typically white or yellow, and can have up to 18 pilei, as opposed to the 6 seen in P. miranda. P. aliweni grows during the rainy months, thriving in moist environments. The distribution range of this species in Chile is over 600 kilometers.
