= Agroathelia coffeicola =

Scientific classification
- Domain: Eukaryota
- Kingdom: Fungi
- Division: Basidiomycota
- Class: Agaricomycetes
- Order: Amylocorticiales
- Genus: Agroathelia
- Species: A. coffeicola

Binomial name
- Agroathelia coffeicola (Stahel) Redhead

Synonyms
- Sclerotium coffeicola Stahel

Pathogen fungus

Agroathelia coffeicola is a sclerotial fungus, commonly called Sclerotium coffeicola, now classified in the order Amylocorticiales. It is a facultative plant pathogen and is the causal agent of target-spot disease of coffee and other tropical plants. It is known from Brazil, Costa Rica, Guyana, Mexico, Puerto Rico, Suriname, Trinidad, Tobago, Venezuela, Panama and Sierra Leone.
