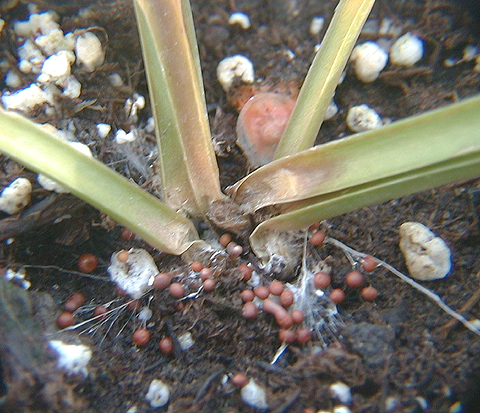
- Sclerotia of A. delphinii near an infected hosta

Scientific classification
- Kingdom: Fungi
- Division: Basidiomycota
- Class: Agaricomycetes
- Order: Amylocorticiales
- Genus: Agroathelia
- Species: A. delphinii

Binomial name
- Agroathelia delphinii (Welch) Redhead (2023)

Synonyms
- Sclerotium delphinii Welch (1924) Sclerotium rolfsii var. delphinii (Welch) Boerema & Hamers, (1988)

= Agroathelia delphinii =

Species of fungus

Agroathelia delphinii is a plant pathogen infecting many tropical and warm temperate plants including mangoes.
