= Podoserpula aliweni =

Scientific classification
- Kingdom: Fungi
- Division: Basidiomycota
- Class: Agaricomycetes
- Order: Amylocorticiales
- Family: Amylocorticiaceae
- Genus: Podoserpula
- Species: P. aliweni

Binomial name
- Podoserpula aliweni Sand.-Leiva & Garnica

Species of fungi in the family Amylocorticiaceae

Podoserpula aliweni
- Mycological characteristics
- Smooth hymenium

Podoserpula aliweni is a species of fungus in the family Amylocorticiaceae within the order Amylocorticiales, native to Chile.

== Taxonomy ==
The species was first described by Pablo Sandoval Leiva and Sigisfredo Garnica in 2021, based on specimens from Purén, Chile. The holotype is deposited in Chilean National Museum of Natural History, under the catalog number SGO 170081.
