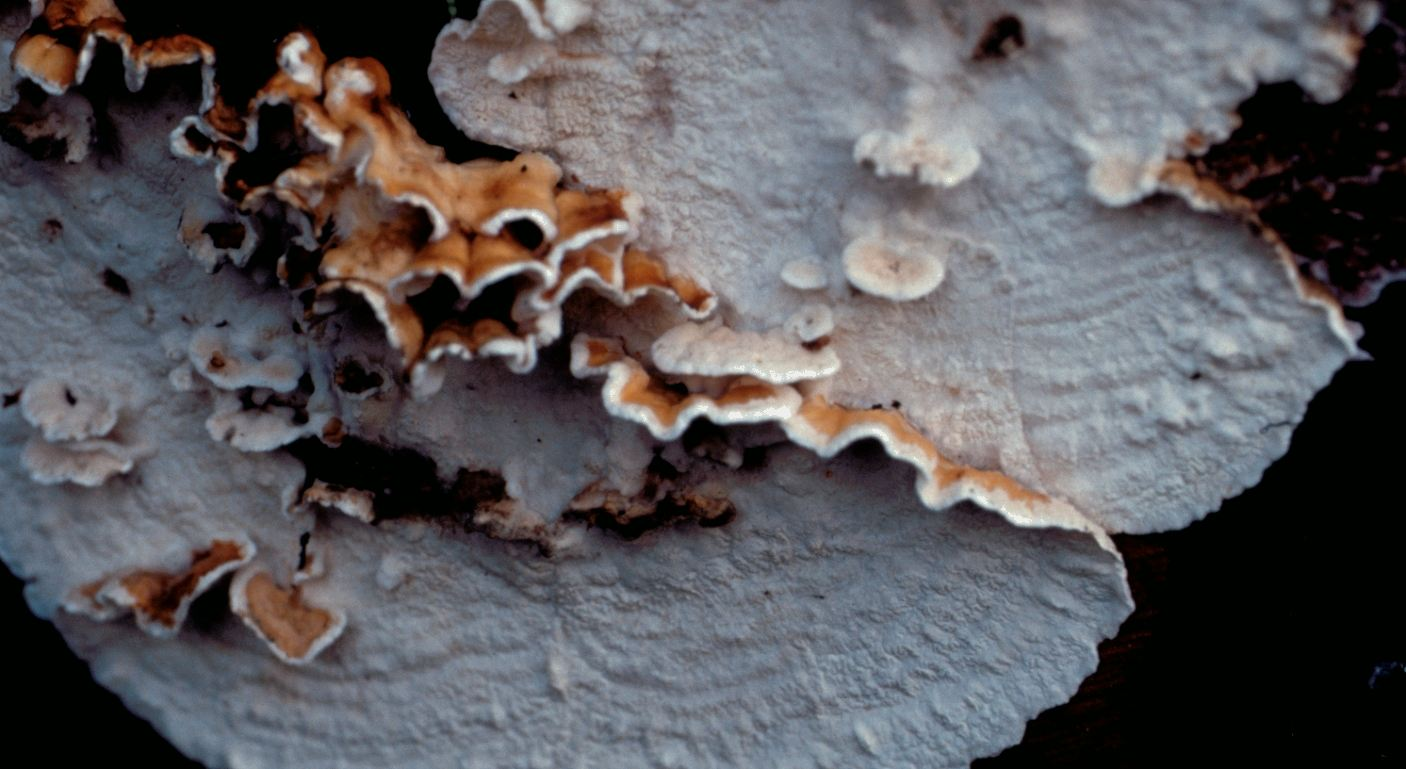
- Plicatura nivea

Scientific classification
- Kingdom: Fungi
- Division: Basidiomycota
- Class: Agaricomycetes
- Order: Amylocorticiales
- Family: Amylocorticiaceae
- Genus: Plicatura; Peck (1872)

Type species
- Plicatura alni Peck (1872)

Species
- P. crispa; P. nivea; P. pendula

Synonyms
- Plicaturopsis D.A. Reid (1964); Irpicodon Pouzar (1966)

= Plicatura =

Genus of fungi

Plicatura is a genus of fungi in the family Amylocorticiaceae. Basidiocarps (fruit bodies) are soft, bracket-like, and have a pleated or toothed undersurface. All known species occur on wood in north temperate forests.

== Taxonomy ==
The genus was originally described from New York in 1872 by American mycologist Charles Horton Peck, with P. alni (later considered a synonym of Plicatura nivea) as the type species. In 1964 English mycologist Derek Reid described the genus Plicaturopsis with P. crispa as the type and in 1966 Czech mycologist Zdeněk Pouzar described Irpicodon to accommodate the hydnoid (toothed) species I. pendulus.

Molecular research, based on cladistic analysis of DNA sequences, has shown that the type species of these three genera are closely related and can be accommodated in a single genus, for which Plicatura is the earliest name.
