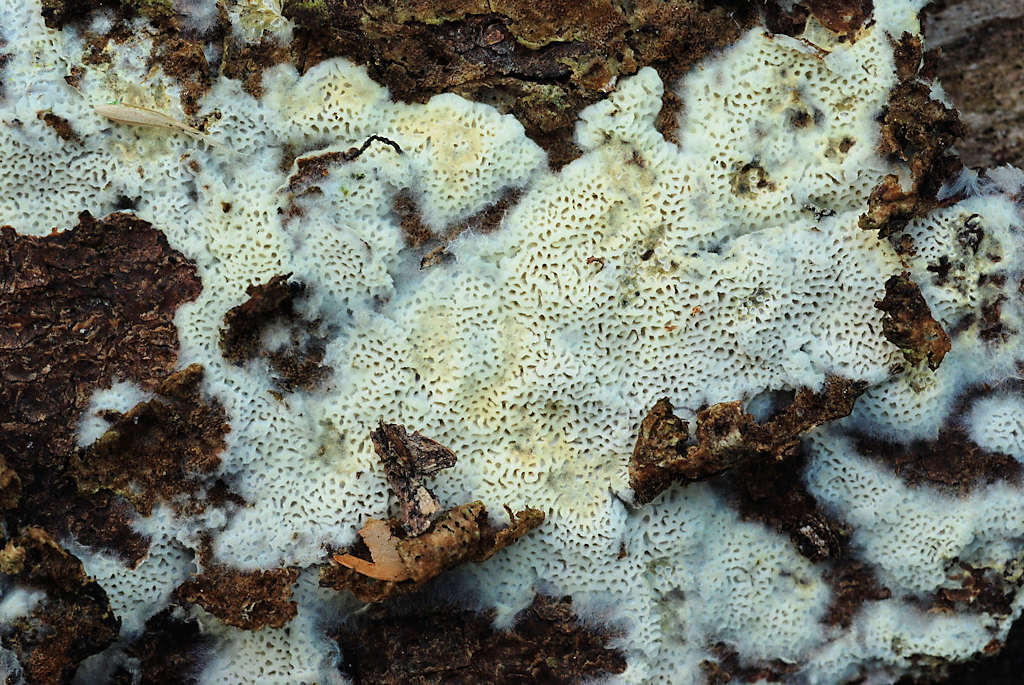

Scientific classification
- Kingdom: Fungi
- Division: Basidiomycota
- Class: Agaricomycetes
- Order: Polyporales
- Family: Fomitopsidaceae
- Genus: Anomoporia
- Species: A. bombycina

Binomial name
- Anomoporia bombycina (Fr.) Pouzar, 1966

= Anomoporia bombycina =

Species of fungus

Anomoporia bombycina is a species of fungus belonging to the family Fomitopsidaceae.

It is native to Europe and Northern America.
