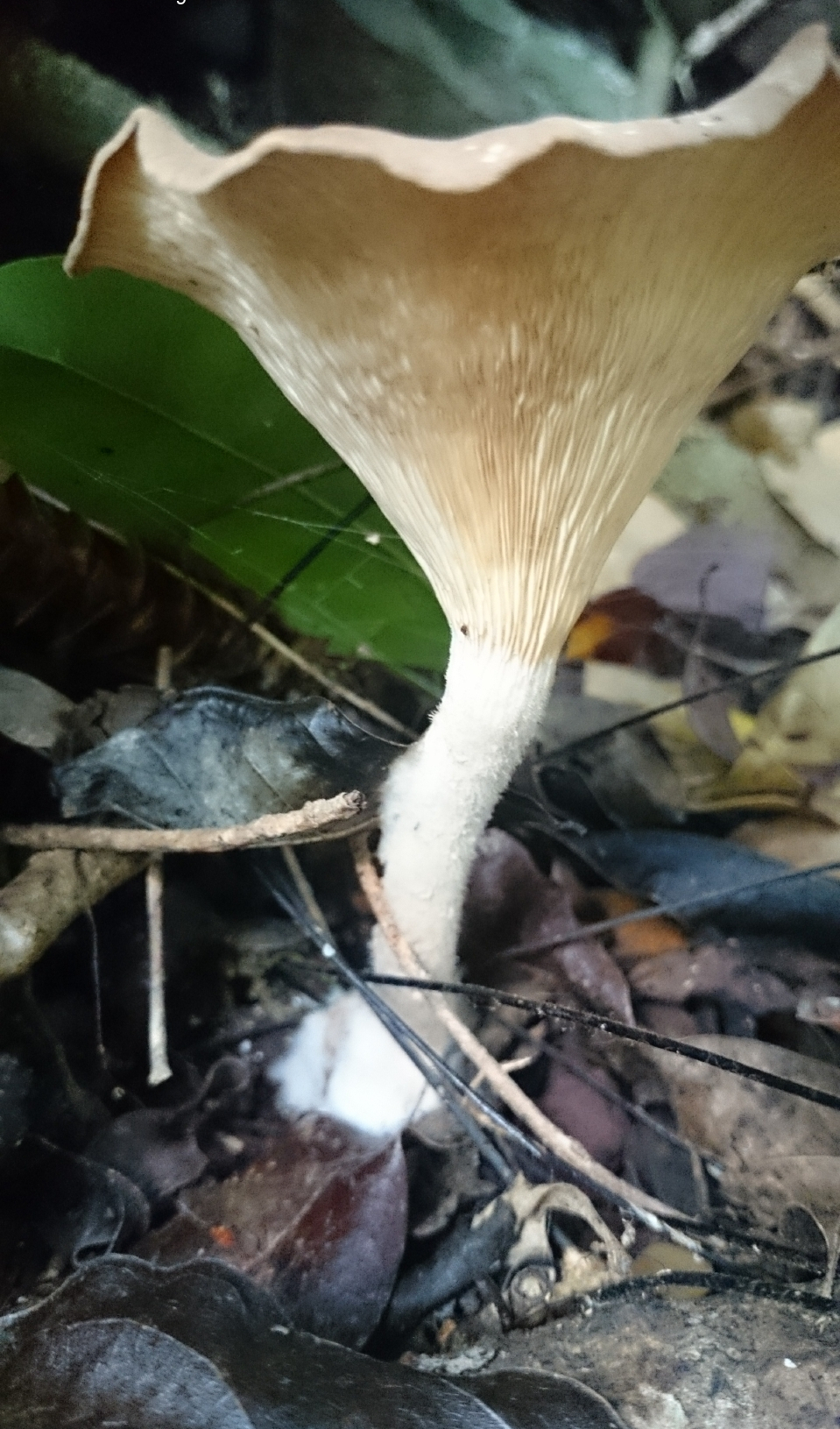

Scientific classification
- Kingdom: Fungi
- Division: Basidiomycota
- Class: Agaricomycetes
- Order: Agaricales
- Family: Pleurotaceae
- Genus: Pleurotus
- Species: P. tuber-regium

Binomial name
- Pleurotus tuber-regium (Rumph. ex Fr.) Singer 1951

Synonyms
- Pachyma tuber-regium Fr. 1822; Lentinus tuber-regium (Fr.) Fr. 1836

= Pleurotus tuber-regium =

Subgenus of mushrooms

Pleurotus sub. tuber-regium
- Mycological characteristics
- Gills on hymenium
- Cap is infundibuliform
- Hymenium is decurrent
- Stipe is bare
- Spore print is white
- Ecology is saprotrophic
- Edibility is edible

Pleurotus tuber-regium, the king tuber mushroom, is an edible gilled fungus native to the tropics, including Africa, Asia, and Australasia. It has been shown to be a distinct species incapable of cross-breeding and phylogenetically removed from other species of Pleurotus.

Pleurotus tuber-regium is a saprotroph found on dead wood, including Daniellia trees in Africa. As the fungus consumes the wood, it produces a sclerotium, or storage tuber, either within the decaying wood or in the underlying soil. These sclerotia are round, dark brown with white interiors, and up to 30 cm wide. The fruiting bodies then emerge from the sclerotium. Both the sclerotium and the fruiting bodies are edible.

In addition to being saprotrophic, P. tuber-regium is also nematophagous, catching nematodes by paralyzing them with a toxin.

Pleurotus tuber-regium has a history of economic importance in Africa as food and as a medicinal mushroom. Industrial cultivation is not yet common, but studies have shown P. tuber-regium can be grown on organic wastes such as corn, sawdust, cardboard. Mycelial growth occurs between 15 °C and 40 °C, with an optimum growth rate at 35 °C. A recent study demonstrated that polysaccharides of P. tuber-regium are able to delay the progression of diabetes and associated complications in rats with insulin resistance.

Pleurotus tuber-regium can degrade polyethylene film.
