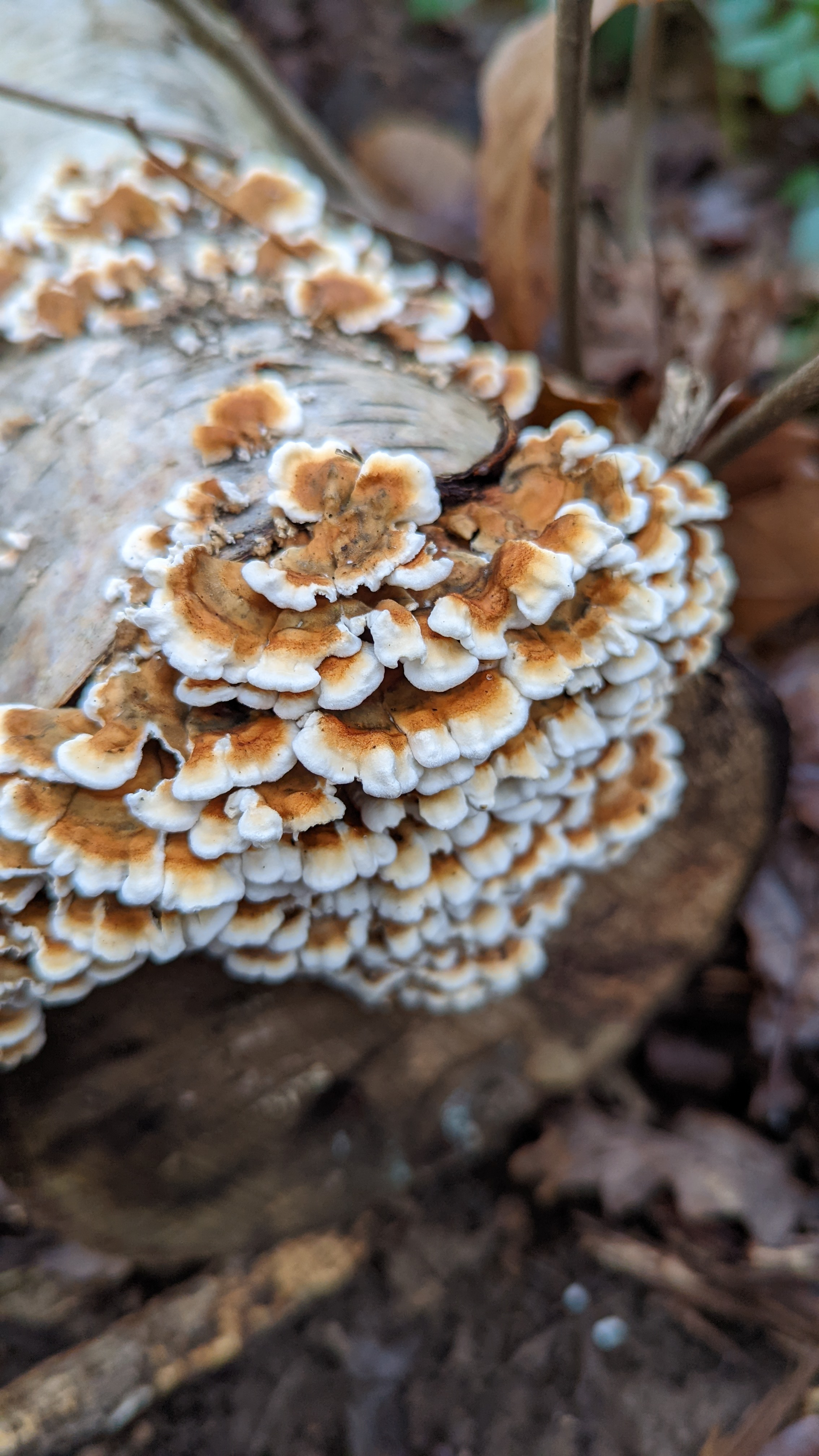

Conservation status
- Secure (NatureServe)

Scientific classification
- Kingdom: Fungi
- Division: Basidiomycota
- Class: Agaricomycetes
- Order: Amylocorticiales
- Family: Amylocorticiaceae
- Genus: Plicatura
- Species: P. crispa

Binomial name
- Plicatura crispa (Pers.) Rea (1922)

Synonyms
- Cantharellus crispus Pers. (1794); Trogia crispa (Pers.) Fr. (1863); Plicaturopsis crispa (Pers.) D.A.Reid (1964); Merulius fagineus Schrad. (1794); Plicatura faginea (Schrad.) P.Karst. (1889)

= Plicatura crispa =

Species of fungus

Plicatura crispa
- Mycological characteristics
- Ridges on hymenium
- Cap is offset
- Hymenium attachment is not applicable
- Lacks a stipe
- Spore print is white
- Ecology is saprotrophic
- Edibility is inedible

Plicatura crispa is a saprotrophic species of fungus in the family Amylocorticiaceae. In the UK, it has the recommended English name of crimped gill. Basidiocarps (fruit bodies) are soft, thin, and bracket-like with a white, gill-like, ridged or pleated undersurface. The species can be found in temperate regions year-round on dead wood of deciduous trees, including hazel, alder, and beech.

== Taxonomy ==
The species was originally described on hazel in 1794 by South African-born Dutch mycologist Christiaan Hendrik Persoon as Cantharellus crispus, a name subsequently sanctioned by Fries in preference to Merulius fagineus, also described in 1794 by German mycologist Heinrich Schrader. The latter name is considered a synonym. British mycologist Carleton Rea transferred Persoon's species to the genus Plicatura in 1922. In 1964 British mycologist Derek Reid, emphasizing the morphological differences between Plicatura crispa and the type species (Plicatura nivea), erected the new, monotypic genus Plicaturopsis for P. crispa.

=== Current status ===
Molecular research, based on cladistic analysis of DNA sequences, has shown that Plicatura crispa is closely related to the type species, P. nivea, and confirms Rea's placement of the species within the genus.

== Description ==
Plicatura crispa forms clusters typically on decomposing branches of deciduous trees. Fruit bodies are generally 1-3 cm in length with bracket-like, semi-circular shell shapes. The upper surface is normally concentrically zoned becoming paler towards the edge. The underside is made up of pale, forked folds, giving a gill-like appearance. It produces white spores which are small, narrowly allantoid, weakly amyloid, and measure 3–4.5 x 1–1.2 μm.

== Distribution ==
The fungus has a wide distribution, having been recorded in Europe, Asia, Australia, and North America. In Britain, its range has been rapidly increasing with 78% of all records dating after the year 2000, many of which are in areas with no previous records of the species.

== Ecology ==
Plicatura crispa is an effective participant in the initial phase of decay, colonizing predominantly dead branches of deciduous trees (Fagus and Betula) and is associated with a white rot. A few years into the succession of wood decomposition, strong competitors such as Trametes versicolor and the split-gill fungus Schizophyllum commune often displace P. crispa.

== Gallery ==
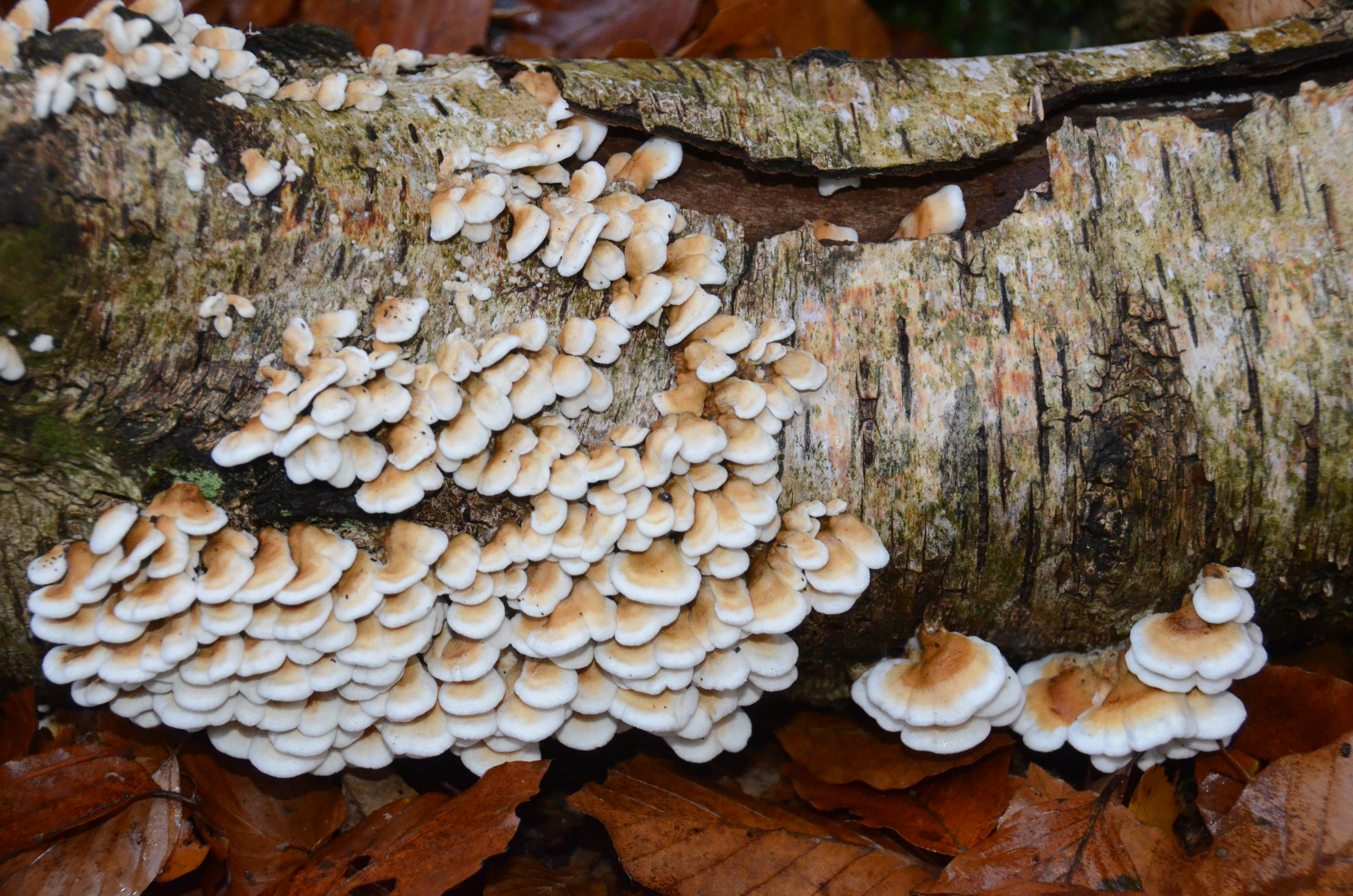
Cluster of P. crispa on a fallen birch Log

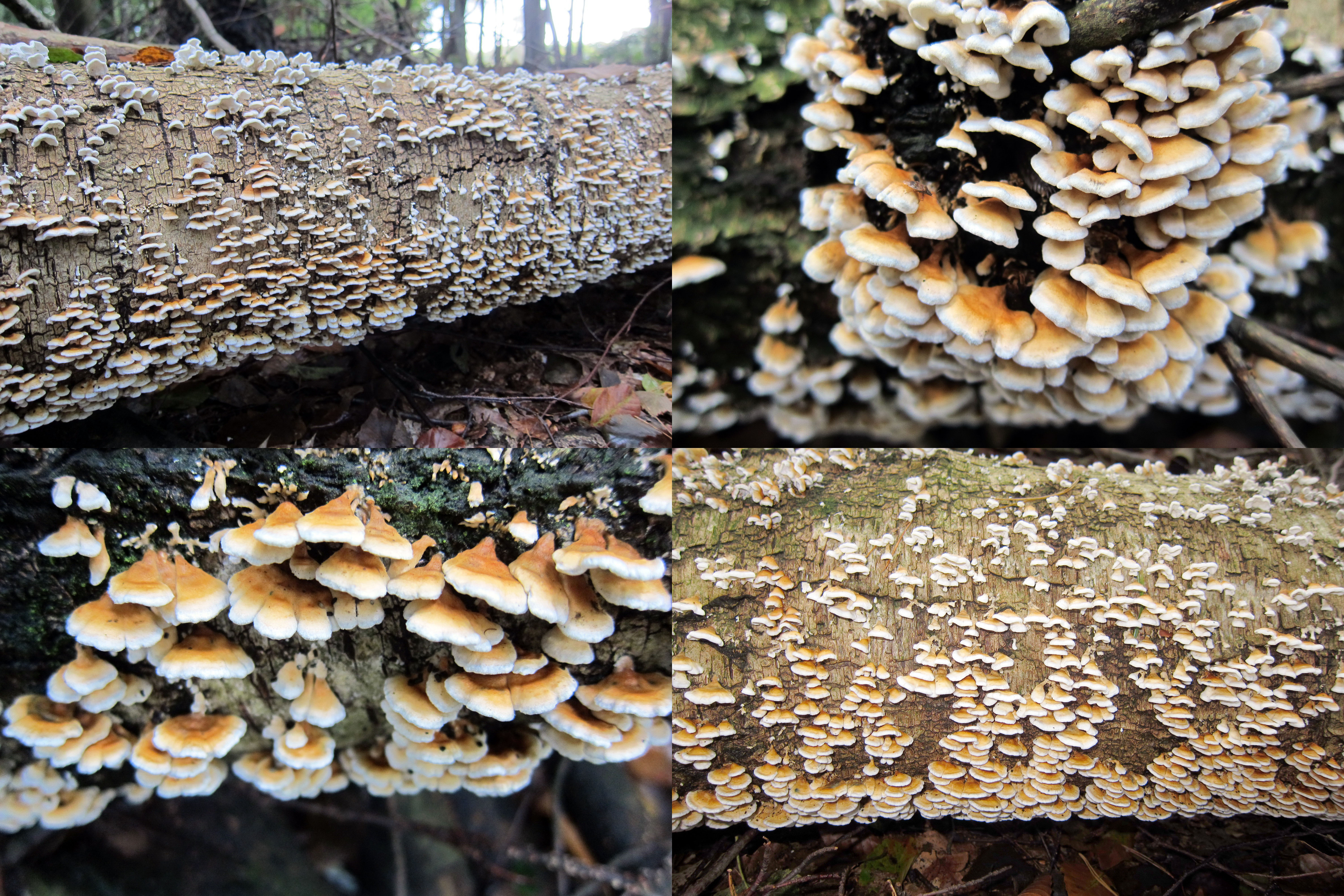

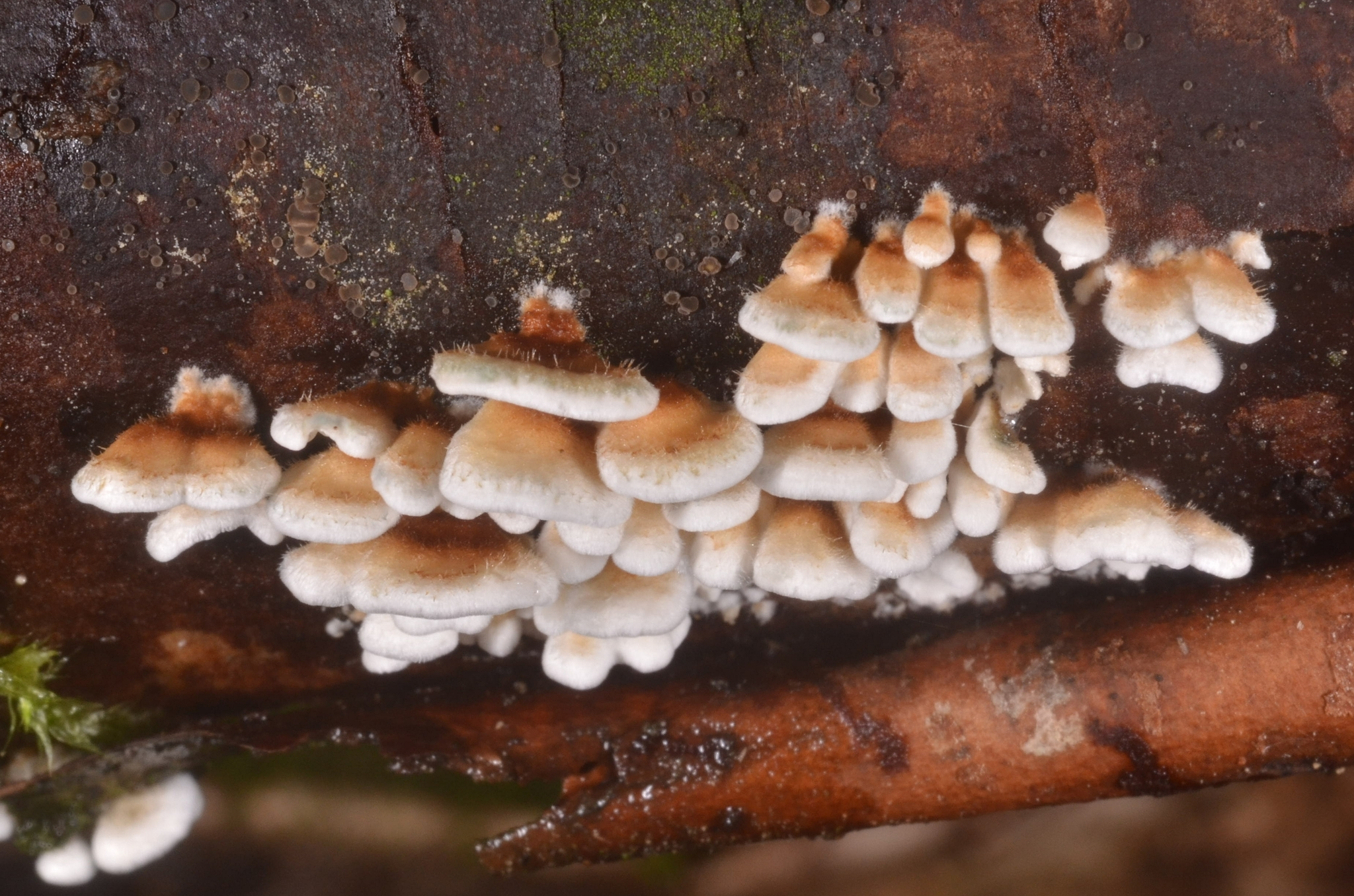
Fruiting bodies of P. crispa

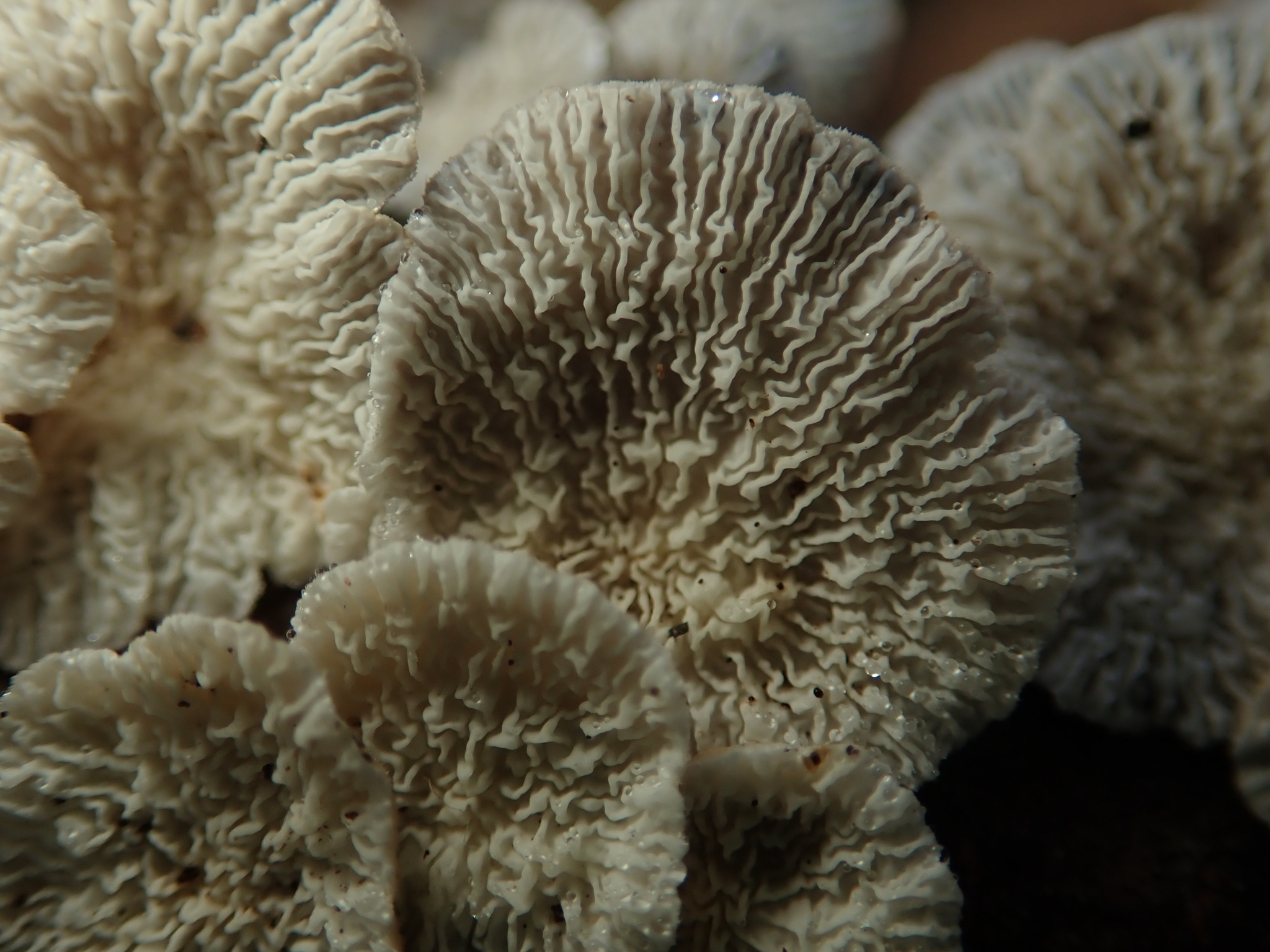
The gill-like ridges of P. crispa
