= Athelopsis =

Scientific classification
- Kingdom: Fungi
- Division: Basidiomycota
- Class: Agaricomycetes
- Order: Atheliales
- Family: Atheliaceae
- Genus: Athelopsis; Oberw. ex Parmasto (1968)

Type species
- Athelopsis glaucina (Bourdot & Galzin) Oberw. ex Parmasto (1968)

Genus of fungi

Athelopsis is a genus of corticioid fungi in the family Amylocorticiaceae. The widespread genus, estimated to contain 10 species, is polyphyletic as currently circumscribed.

== Species ==
- Athelopsis baculifera
- Athelopsis bispora
- Athelopsis colombiensis
- Athelopsis galzinii
- Athelopsis glaucina
- Athelopsis gloeocystidiata
- Athelopsis lacerata
- Athelopsis lembospora
- Athelopsis lunata
- Athelopsis subinconspicua
- Athelopsis virescens
