= Hypochniciellum =

Scientific classification
- Kingdom: Fungi
- Division: Basidiomycota
- Class: Agaricomycetes
- Order: Amylocorticiales
- Family: Amylocorticiaceae
- Genus: Hypochniciellum; Hjortstam & Ryvarden (1980)

Type species
- Hypochniciellum ovoideum Hjortstam & Ryvarden (1980)

Species
- H. iaganicum; H. luteolum; H. ovoideum

Genus of fungi

Hypochniciellum is a genus of corticioid fungi in the family Amylocorticiaceae. Species in the genus have white to cream, resupinate fruit bodies (growing flat, like a crust). The hyphae have clamp connections. The spores are roughly elliptical, yellowish, and smooth.
