= Plicatura pendula =

Scientific classification
- Kingdom: Fungi
- Division: Basidiomycota
- Class: Agaricomycetes
- Order: Amylocorticiales
- Family: Amylocorticiaceae
- Genus: Plicatura
- Species: P. pendula

Binomial name
- Plicatura pendula (Alb. & Schwein.) Palla, V. Papp & Dima (2024)

Synonyms
- Sistotrema pendulum Alb. & Schwein. (1805); Hydnum pendulum (Alb. & Schwein.) Fr. (1821); Radulum pendulum (Alb. & Schwein.) Fr. (1825); Irpex pendulus (Alb. & Schwein.) Fr. (1828); Xylodon pendulus (Alb. & Schwein.) Kuntze (1898); Corticium pendulum (Alb. & Schwein.) Donk (1958); Irpicodon pendulus (Alb. & Schwein.) Pouzar (1966)

Species of fungus

Plicatura pendula is a species of fungus in the family Amylocorticiaceae. Basidiocarps (fruit bodies) are soft, bracket-like, and have a hydnoid (toothed) undersurface. They are typically formed on conifer logs, especially those of Pinus sylvestris, and are found in continental Europe. Plicatura pendula was formerly referred to the genus Irpicodon, but molecular research, based on cladistic analysis of DNA sequences, has shown that the species is closely related to Plicatura nivea, the type species of Plicatura, and belongs within the latter genus.
