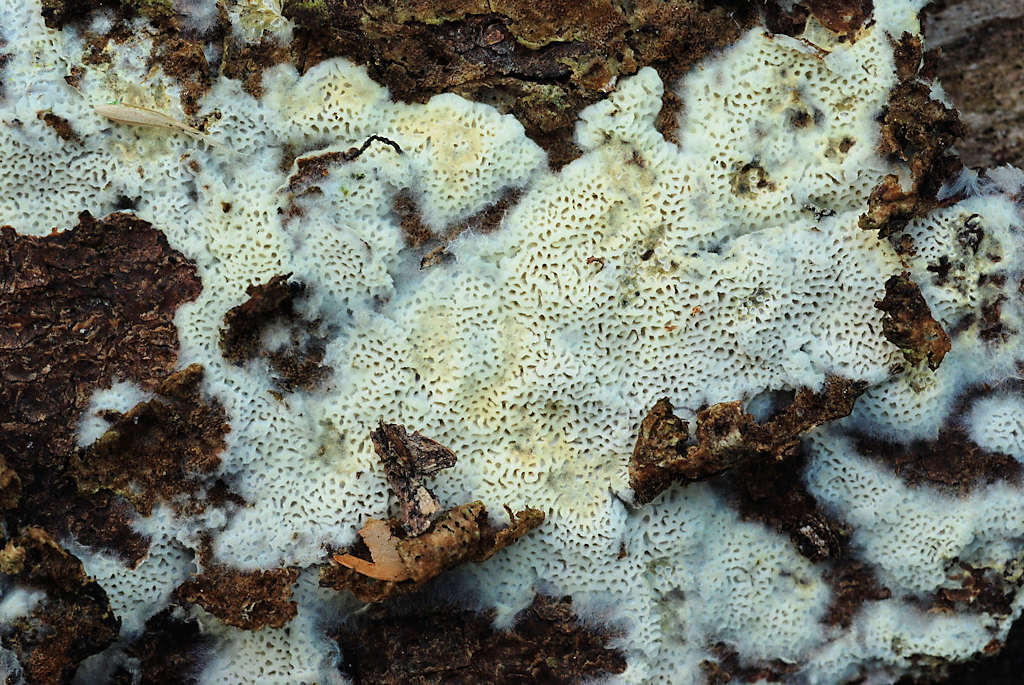
- Anomoporia bombycina

Scientific classification
- Kingdom: Fungi
- Division: Basidiomycota
- Class: Agaricomycetes
- Order: Polyporales
- Family: Fomitopsidaceae
- Genus: Anomoporia; Pouzar (1966)

Type species
- Anomoporia bombycina (Fr.) Pouzar (1966)

= Anomoporia =

Genus of fungi

Anomoporia is a genus of fungi in the family Amylocorticiaceae. The genus was circumscribed by Czech mycologist Zdeněk Pouzar in 1966.

== Species list ==
- Anomoporia albolutescens
- Anomoporia ambigua
- Anomoporia bombycina
- Anomoporia dumontii
- Anomoporia flavissima
- Anomoporia irpicoides
- Anomoporia kamtschatica
- Anomoporia myceliosa
- Anomoporia neotropica
- Anomoporia vesiculosa
