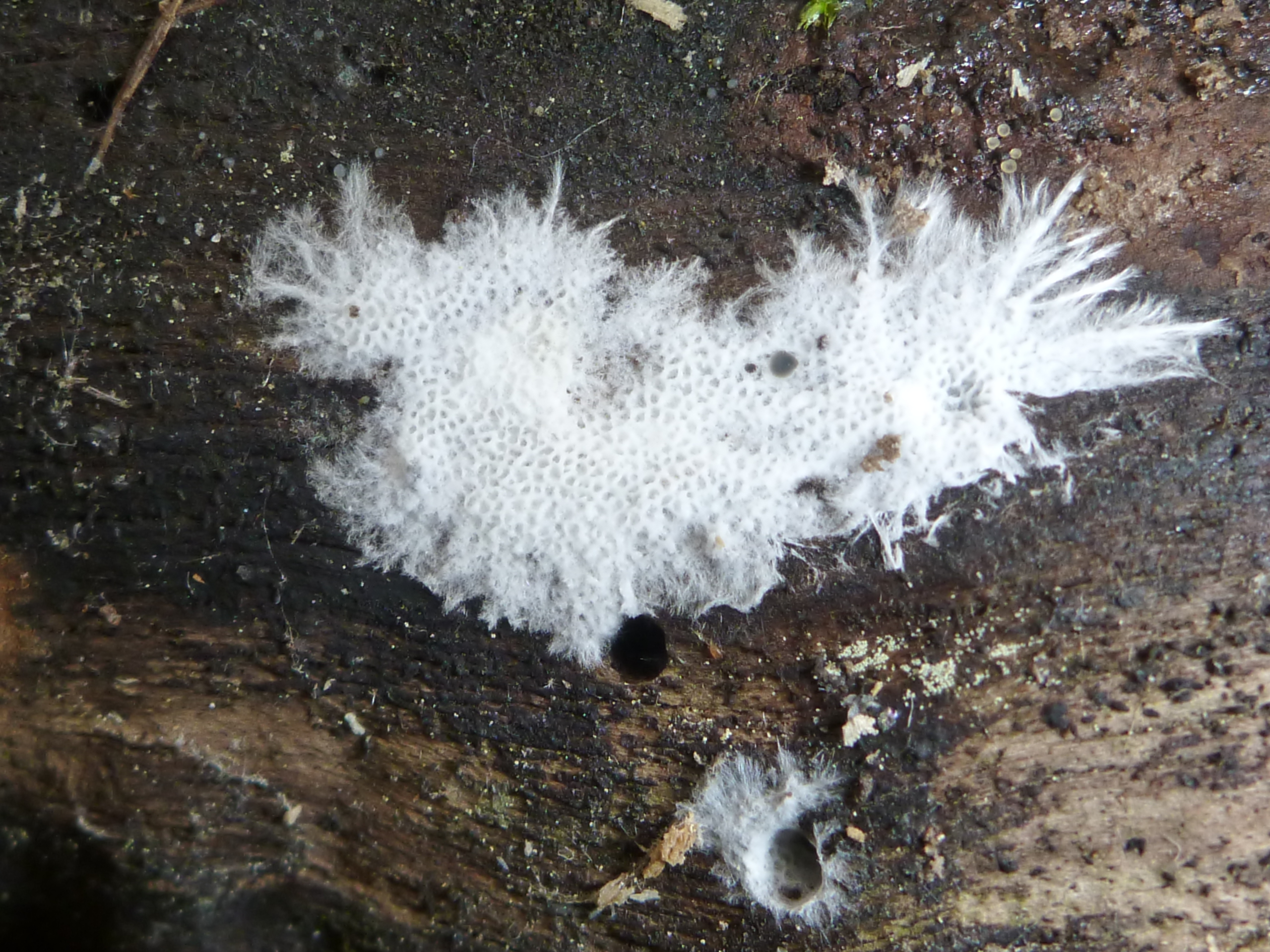
- Anomoloma myceliosum

Scientific classification
- Kingdom: Fungi
- Division: Basidiomycota
- Class: Agaricomycetes
- Order: Amylocorticiales
- Family: Amylocorticiaceae
- Genus: Anomoloma; Niemelä & K.H.Larss. (2007)

Type species
- Anomoloma albolutescens (Romell) Niemelä & K.H.Larss. (2007)

Species
- A. albolutescens A. flavissimum A. myceliosum A. rhizosum

= Anomoloma =

Genus of fungi

Anomoloma is a genus of crust fungi in the family Amylocorticiaceae. It was circumscribed by mycologists Tuomo Niemelä and Karl-Henrik Larsson in 2007. The generic name is derived from the Greek anomos, meaning "lawless", referring to the irregular rhizomorphic outline, and loma, meaning "margin" or "edge."
