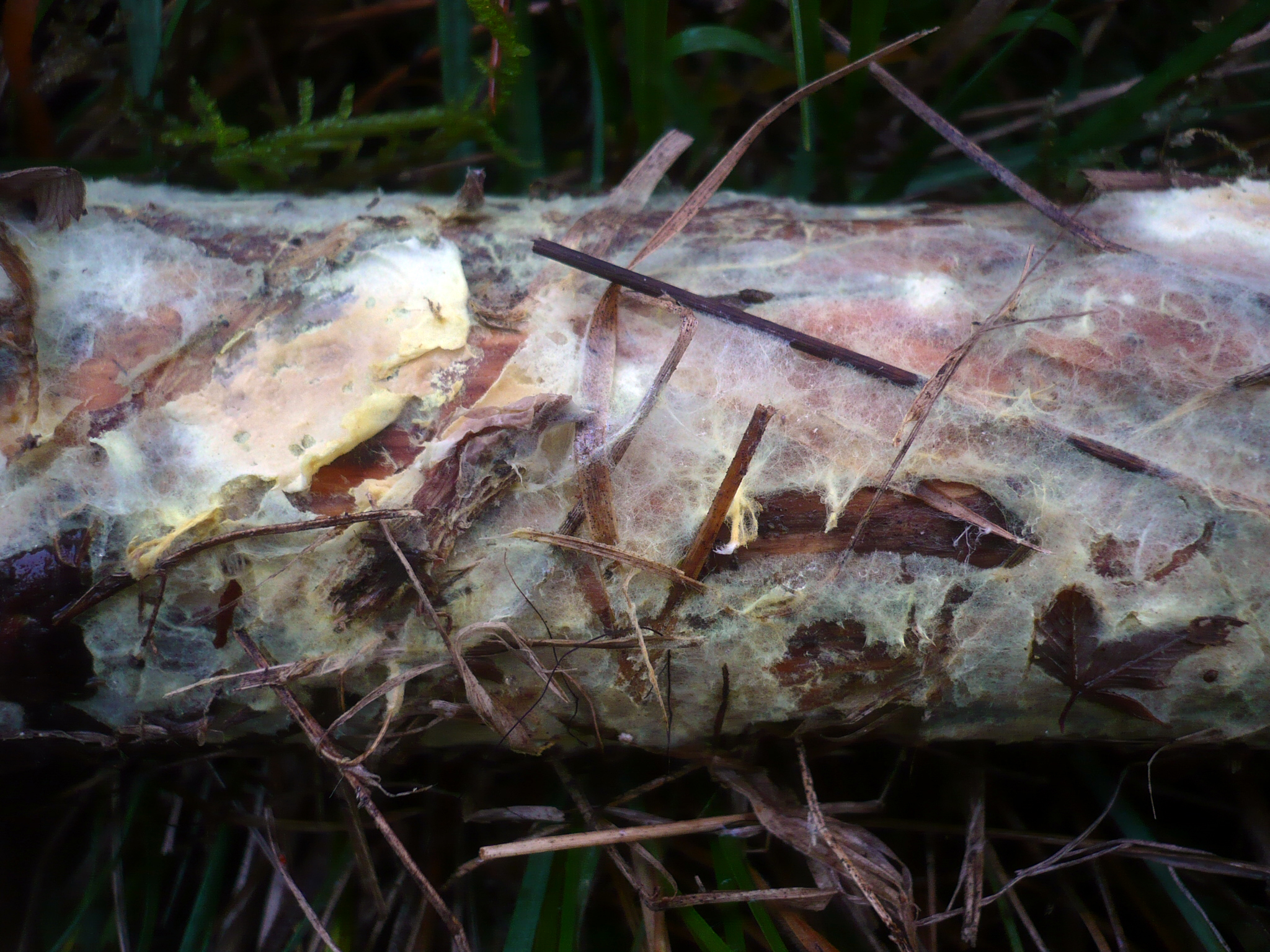
- Amylocorticium subincarnatum

Scientific classification
- Kingdom: Fungi
- Division: Basidiomycota
- Class: Agaricomycetes
- Order: Amylocorticiales
- Family: Amylocorticiaceae
- Genus: Amyloxenasma (Oberw.) Hjortstam & Ryvarden (2005)

Type species
- Amyloxenasma grisellum (Bourdot) Hjortstam & Ryvarden (2005)

Species
- A. allantosporum A. elongatisporum A. grisellum A. lloydii A. pruina A. rallum

Synonyms
- Xenasmatella subgen. Amyloxenasma Oberw. (1966)

= Amyloxenasma =

Genus of fungi

Amyloxenasma is a genus of corticioid fungi in the family Amylocorticiaceae. The widely distributed genus contains six species.
