= Amylocorticiellum =

Scientific classification
- Kingdom: Fungi
- Division: Basidiomycota
- Class: Agaricomycetes
- Order: Amylocorticiales
- Family: Amylocorticiaceae
- Genus: Amylocorticiellum; Spirin & Zmitr. (2002)

Type species
- Amylocorticiellum subillaqueatum (Litsch.) Spirin & Zmitr. (2002)

Species
- A. cremeoisabellinum A. molle A. sinuosum A. subillaqueatum

Genus of fungi

Amylocorticiellum is a genus of fungi in the family Amylocorticiaceae. The genus has a widespread distribution and contains four species.
