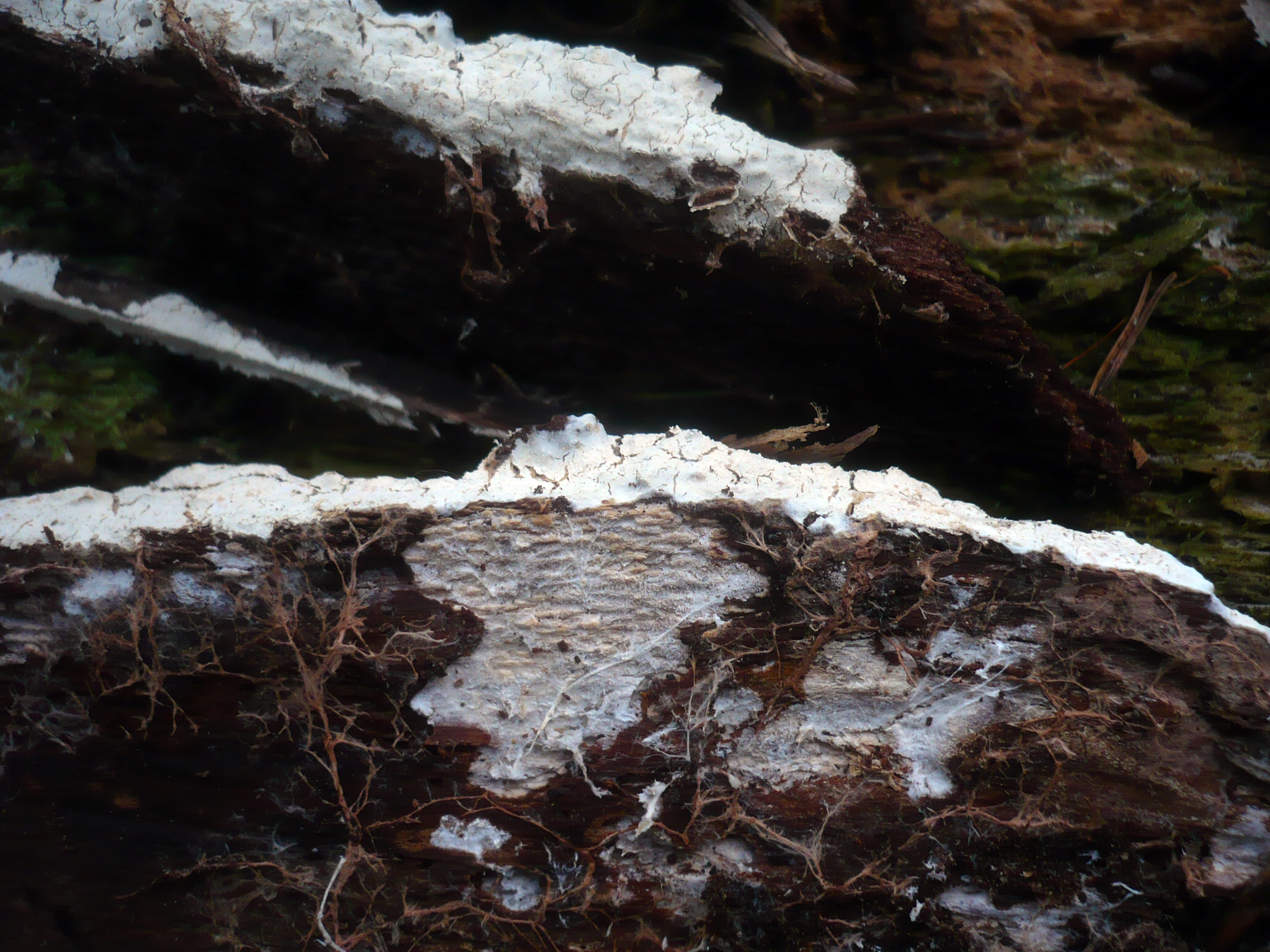
- Leptosporomyces roseus

Scientific classification
- Kingdom: Fungi
- Division: Basidiomycota
- Class: Agaricomycetes
- Order: Amylocorticiales
- Family: Amylocorticiaceae
- Genus: Leptosporomyces; Jülich (1972)

Type species
- Leptosporomyces galzinii (Bourdot) Jülich (1972)

Synonyms
- Fibulomyces Jülich (1972)

= Leptosporomyces =

Genus of fungi

Leptosporomyces is a genus of resupinate (crust-like) fungi in the family Amylocorticiaceae. The genus is widespread in the Northern Hemisphere and contains 11 species.

== Species ==
- Leptosporomyces adnatus
- Leptosporomyces fuscostratus
- Leptosporomyces galzinii
- Leptosporomyces globosus
- Leptosporomyces juniperinus
- Leptosporomyces luteofibrillosus
- Leptosporomyces montanus
- Leptosporomyces mundus
- Leptosporomyces raunkiaeri
- Leptosporomyces roseus
- Leptosporomyces septentrionalis
