= Amyloathelia =

Scientific classification
- Kingdom: Fungi
- Division: Basidiomycota
- Class: Agaricomycetes
- Order: Amylocorticiales
- Family: Amylocorticiaceae
- Genus: Amyloathelia; Hjortstam & Ryvarden (1979)

Type species
- Amyloathelia amylacea Hjortstam & Ryvarden (1979)

Species
- A. amylacea A. aspera A. crassiuscula

Genus of fungi

Amyloathelia is a genus of fungi in the family Amylocorticiaceae. The genus contains three species distributed in Europe and South America.
