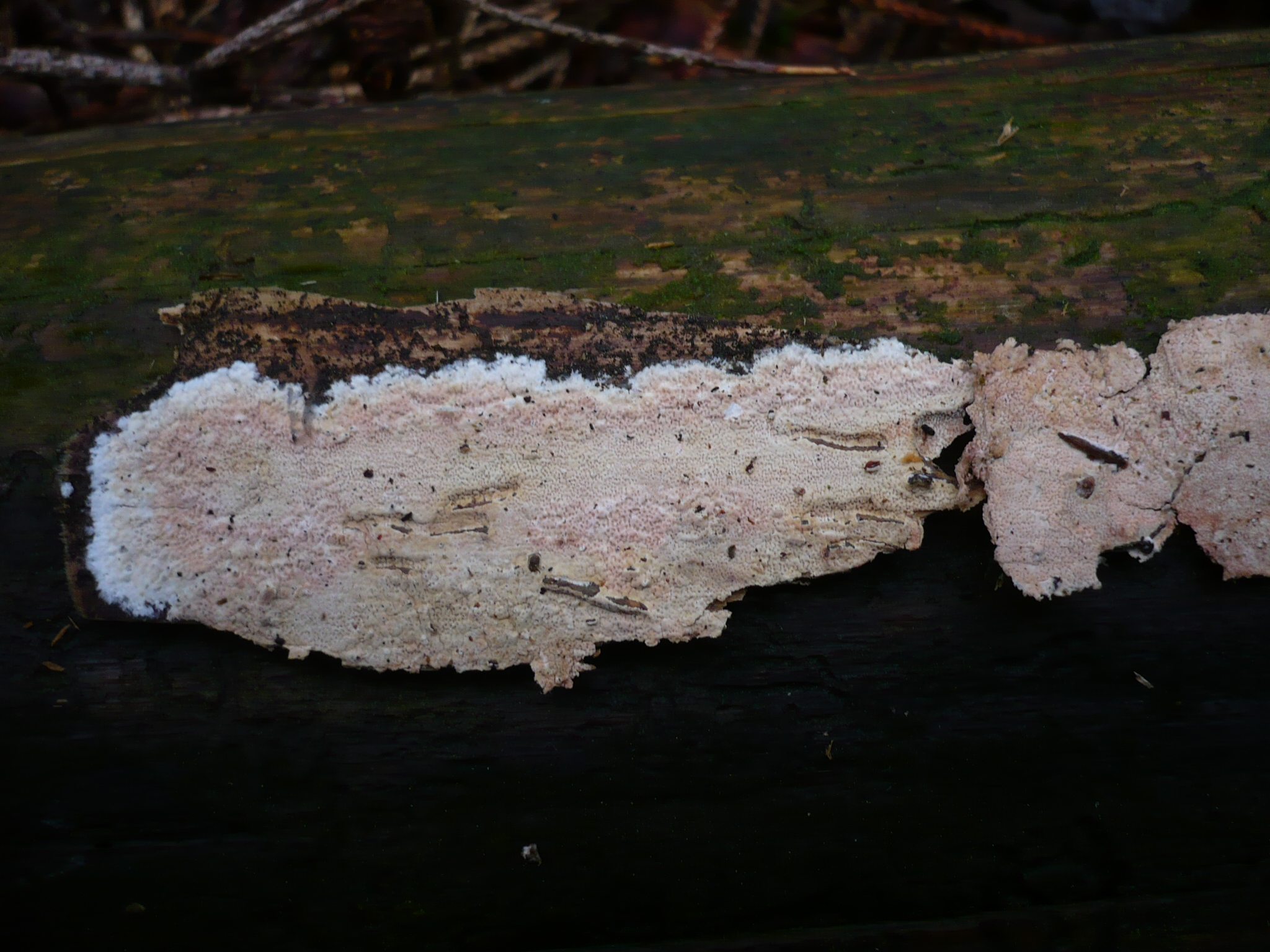
- Ceraceomyces sublaevi

Scientific classification
- Kingdom: Fungi
- Division: Basidiomycota
- Class: Agaricomycetes
- Order: Amylocorticiales
- Family: Amylocorticiaceae
- Genus: Ceraceomyces; Jülich (1972)

Type species
- Ceraceomyces tessulatus (Cooke) Jülich (1972)

= Ceraceomyces =

Genus of fungi

Ceraceomyces is a genus of fungi in the family Amylocorticiaceae. The genus has a widespread distribution and contains 16 species.

== Species ==
- Ceraceomyces borealis
- Ceraceomyces cerebrosus
- Ceraceomyces corymbatus
- Ceraceomyces cremeo-ochraceus
- Ceraceomyces crispatus
- Ceraceomyces cystidiatus
- Ceraceomyces microsporus
- Ceraceomyces oligodontus
- Ceraceomyces reidii
- Ceraceomyces serpens
- Ceraceomyces sublaevis
- Ceraceomyces sulphurinus
- Ceraceomyces tessulatus
- Ceraceomyces variicolor
- Ceraceomyces violascens
