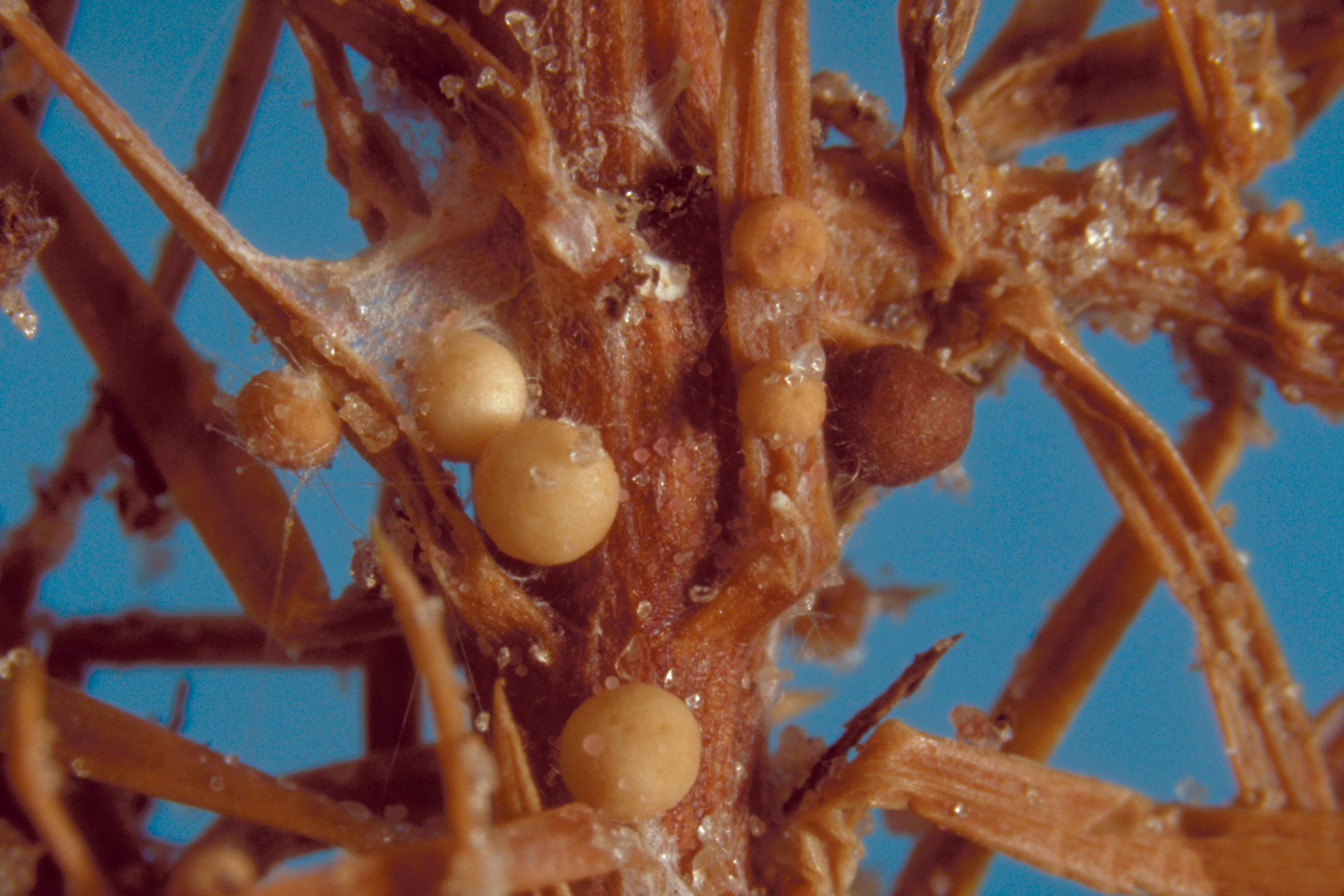

Scientific classification
- Domain: Eukaryota
- Kingdom: Fungi
- Division: Basidiomycota
- Class: Agaricomycetes
- Order: Amylocorticiales
- Genus: Agroathelia; Redhead & Mullineux (2023)

Type species
- Agroathelia rolfsii (Sacc.) Redhead & Mullineux (2023)

= Agroathelia =

Genus of fungi

Agroathelia is a fungal genus currently consisting of one widespread and two other species. Agroathelia rolfsii, the type species, causes serious diseases of cultivated crops such as tomatoes, potatoes, peanuts, bell peppers, and sweet potatoes among many other hosts. It is better known under the names Sclerotium rolfsii or Athelia rolfsii.

Agroathelia coffeicola, also known as Sclerotium coffeicola, infects coffee leaves and beans in South America and on various other plants in Central America and the Caribbean, while Agroathelia delphinii, also known as Sclerotium delphinii, attacks numerous plants, including Delphinium after which it was named.

Agroathelia is a member of the Amylocorticiales rather than the Atheliales where it had been placed previously The genus is characterized by the production of brownish, mustard seed-sized or larger sclerotia with diagnostic polyhedron-shaped cortical cells. They have 4-spored, clavate basidia, nonamyloid, ellipsoid basidiospores and a smooth hymenium. Basidia are rarely observed in nature.

== Etymology ==
Agro- (Greek, agrós, "field") and Athelia (a genus of corticioid fungi), in reference to its resemblance to the corticioid genus of fungi, Athelia and its occurrence in agricultural fields.

== Species ==
- Agroathelia coffeicola
- Agroathelia delphinii
- Agroathelia rolfsii
