= Serpulomyces =

Scientific classification
- Kingdom: Fungi
- Division: Basidiomycota
- Class: Agaricomycetes
- Order: Amylocorticiales
- Family: Amylocorticiaceae
- Genus: Serpulomyces (Zmitr.) Zmitr. (2002)

Type species
- Serpulomyces borealis (Romell) Zmitr. (2002)

Synonyms
- Athelia borealis (Romell) Parm. (1967); Merulius borealis Romell (1911); Ceraceomyces borealis (Romell) J.Eriksson & Ryvarden (1973); Serpula borealis (Romell) Zmitr.(2001)

Genus of fungi

Serpulomyces is a genus of fungi in the family Amylocorticiaceae. The genus is monotypic, containing the single species Serpulomyces borealis, found in Europe. Serpulomyces was described by Ivan Zmitrovich in 2002.
