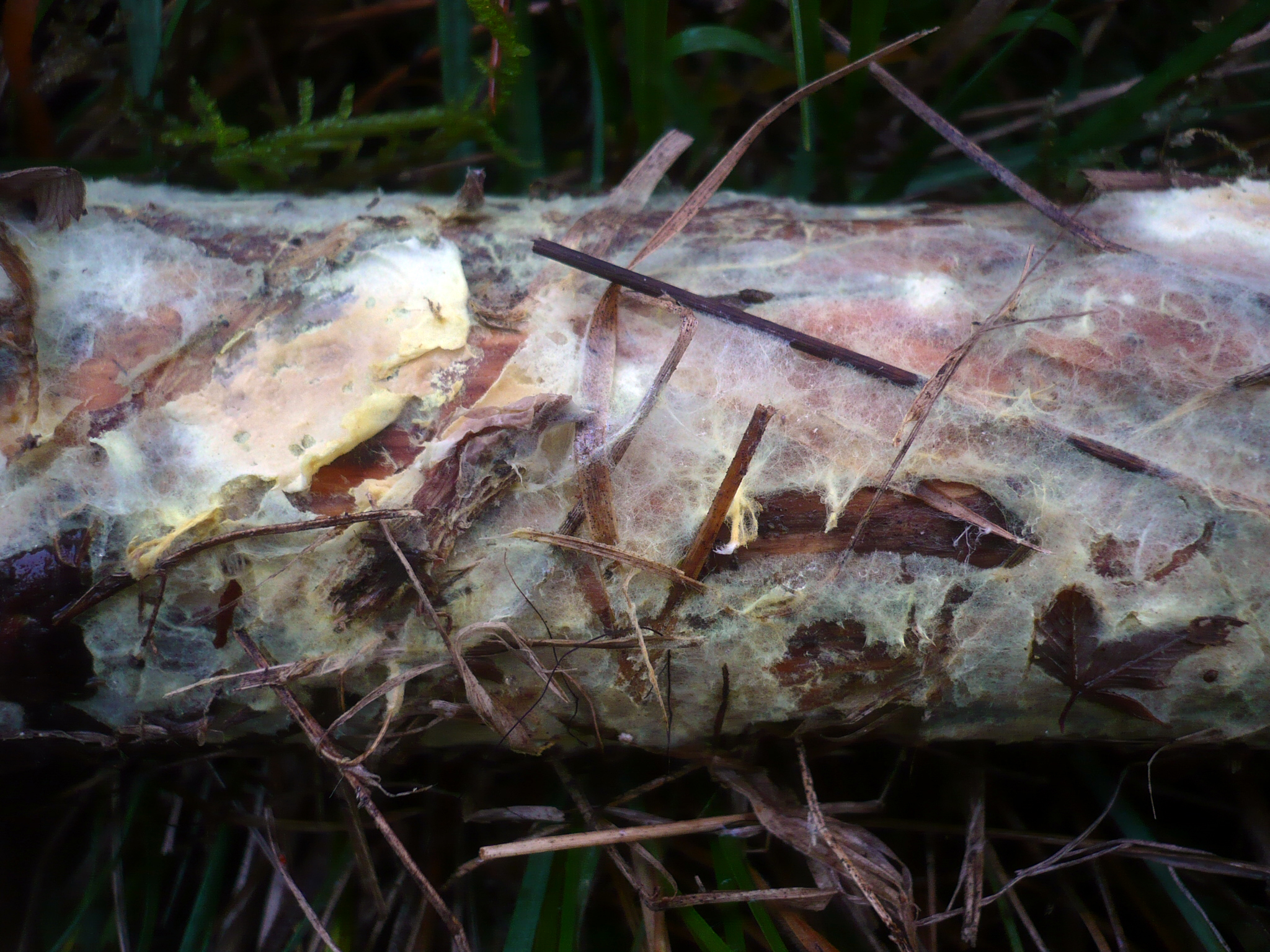
- Amylocorticium subincarnatum

Scientific classification
- Kingdom: Fungi
- Division: Basidiomycota
- Class: Agaricomycetes
- Order: Amylocorticiales
- Family: Amylocorticiaceae
- Genus: Amylocorticium; Pouzar (1959)

Type species
- Amylocorticium subsulphureum (P.Karst.) Pouzar (1959)

= Amylocorticium =

Genus of fungi

Amylocorticium is a genus of resupinate (crust-like) fungi in the Amylocorticiaceae family. The genus has a widespread distribution and contains 11 species.

== Species ==
- Amylocorticium africanum
- Amylocorticium canadense
- Amylocorticium cebennense
- Amylocorticium cumminsii
- Amylocorticium indicum
- Amylocorticium mauiense
- Amylocorticium pedunculatum
- Amylocorticium rhodoleucum
- Amylocorticium suaveolens
- Amylocorticium subincarnatum
- Amylocorticium subsulphureum
