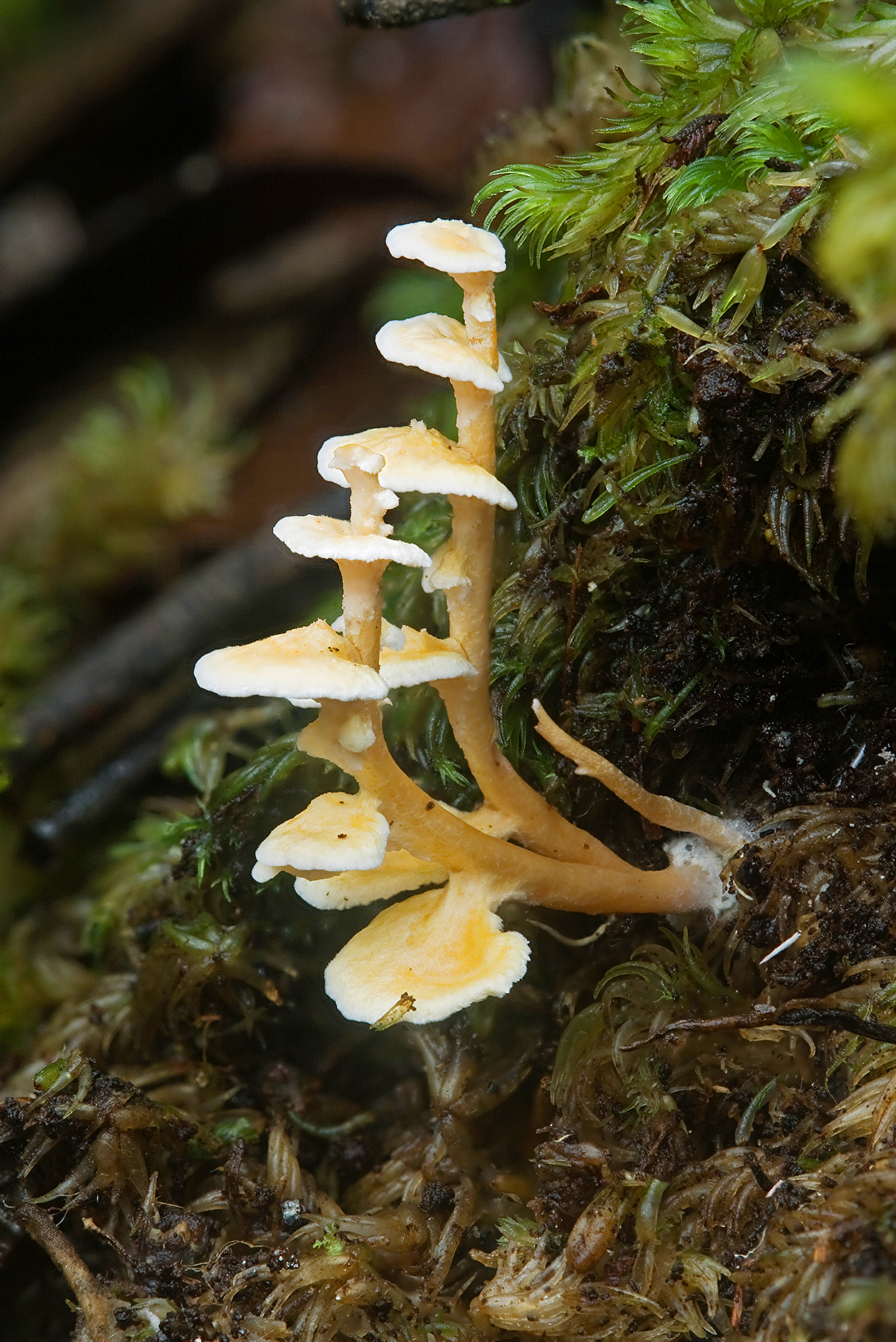
- Podoserpula pusio var. pusio, Tasmania, Australia

Scientific classification
- Domain: Eukaryota
- Kingdom: Fungi
- Division: Basidiomycota
- Class: Agaricomycetes
- Order: Amylocorticiales
- Family: Amylocorticiaceae
- Genus: Podoserpula
- Species: P. pusio

Binomial name
- Podoserpula pusio (Berk.) D.A.Reid (1963)

Synonyms
- Craterellus pusio Berk. (1859); Craterellus multiplex Cooke & Massee (1889); Merulius pusio (Berk.) Kuntze (1891); Cantharellus multiplex (Cooke & Massee) Lloyd (1920)

= Podoserpula pusio =

Species of fungus

Podoserpula pusio, commonly known as the pagoda fungus, is a species of fungus in the family Amylocorticiaceae. It is the type species of the genus Podoserpula.
