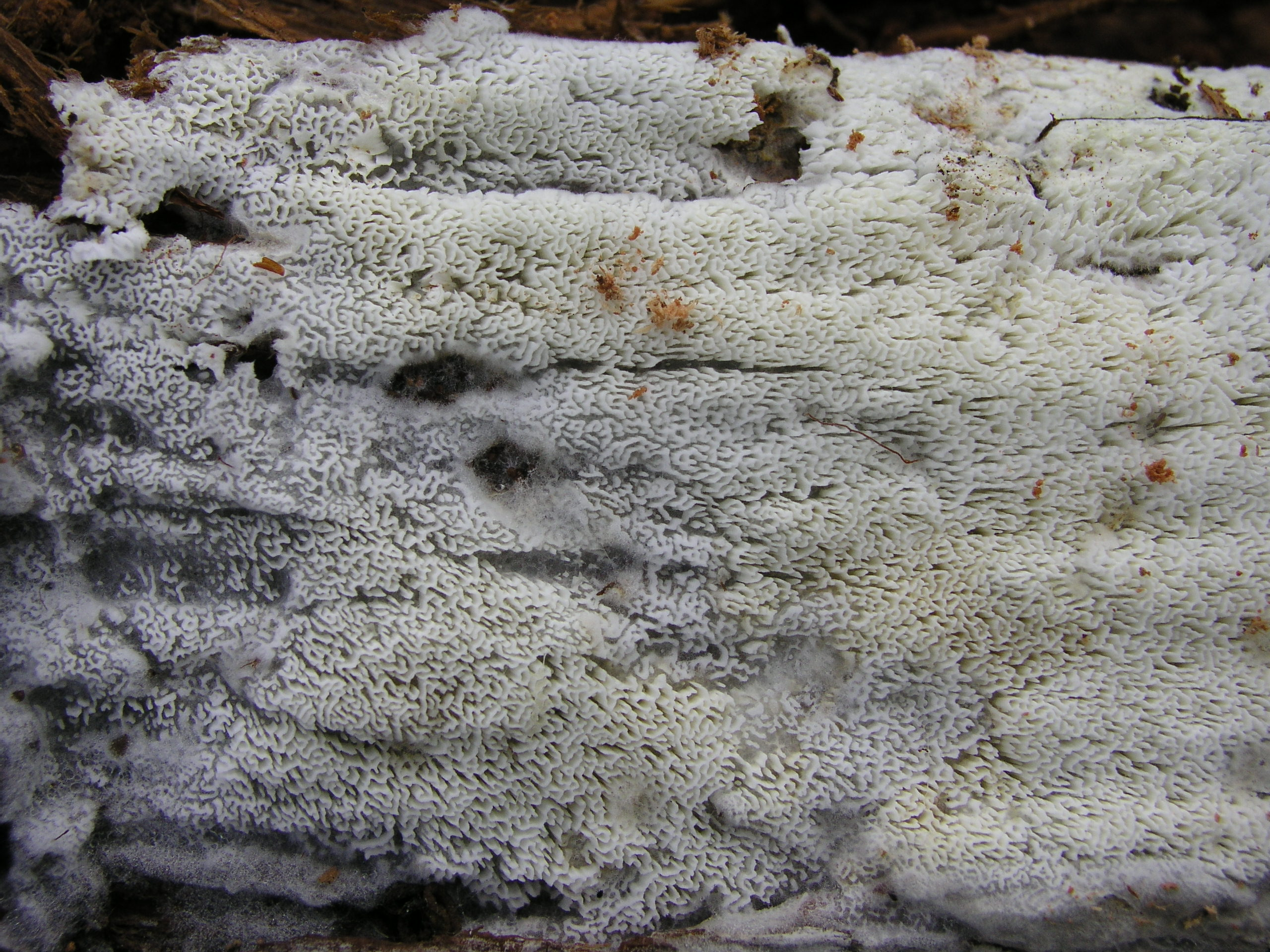

Scientific classification
- Kingdom: Fungi
- Division: Basidiomycota
- Class: Agaricomycetes
- Order: Polyporales
- Family: Fomitopsidaceae
- Genus: Anomoporia
- Species: A. kamtschatica

Binomial name
- Anomoporia kamtschatica (Parmasto) Bondartseva

= Anomoporia kamtschatica =

Species of fungus

Anomoporia kamtschatica is a species of fungus belonging to the family Fomitopsidaceae. Typically found on rotten conifer wood, it consists of white-rot and brown-rot fungi.

It is native to Europe and Northern America.
