= Sclerotium =

Mycelial mass

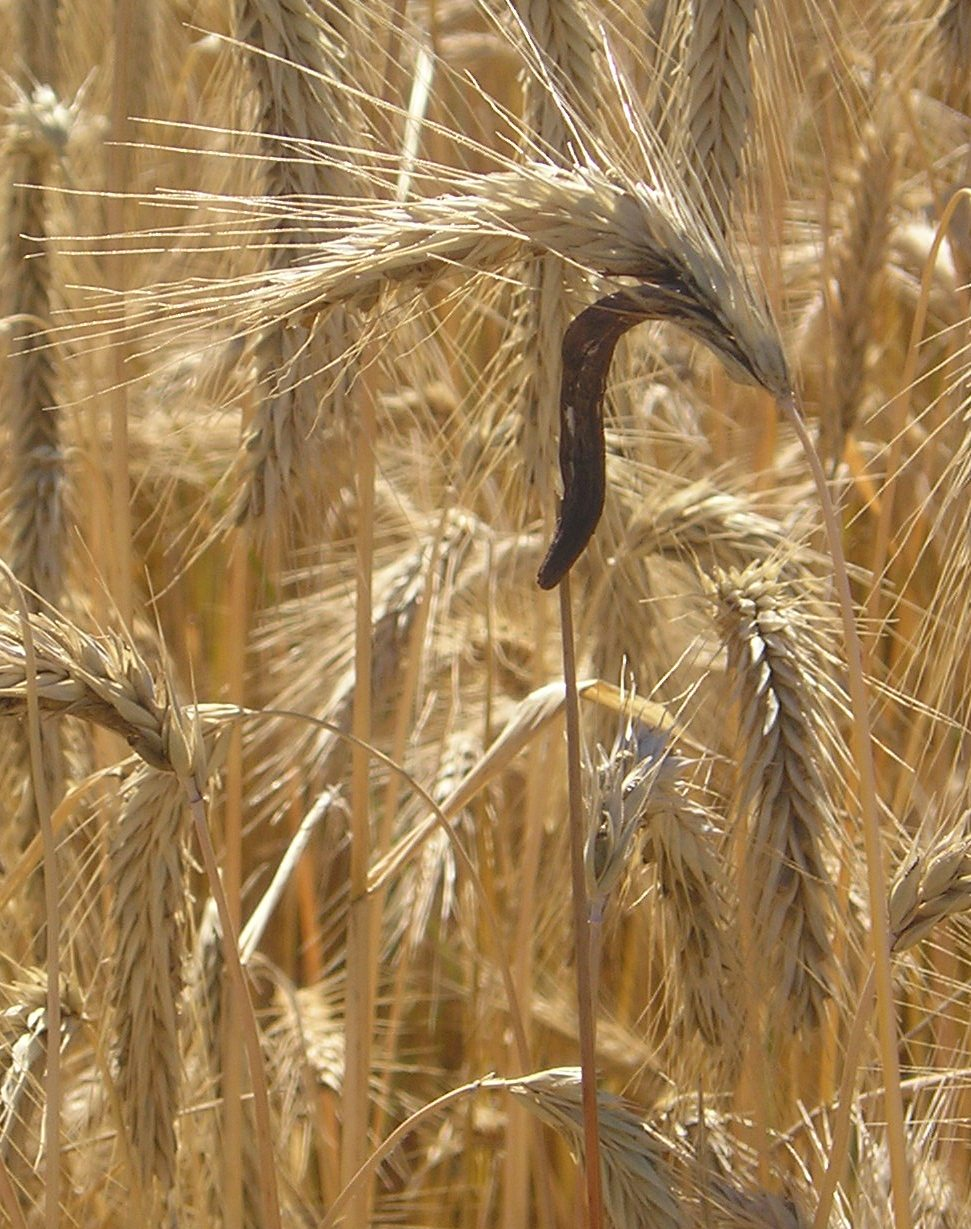
Sclerotia of the ergot species Claviceps purpurea developing on wheat spikes

A sclerotium (/skləˈroʊʃəm/; pl.: sclerotia (/skləˈroʊʃə/) (Note: The word sclerotium comes to English from Neo-Latin, from Ancient Greek σκληρός (sklērós) 'hard'.) is a compact mass of hardened fungal mycelium containing food reserves. One role of sclerotia is to survive environmental extremes. In some higher fungi such as ergot, sclerotia become detached and remain dormant until favorable growth conditions return. Sclerotia initially were mistaken for individual organisms and described as separate species until Louis René Tulasne proved in 1853 that sclerotia are only a stage in the life cycle of some fungi. Further investigation showed that this stage appears in many fungi belonging to many diverse groups. Sclerotia are important in the understanding of the life cycle and reproduction of fungi, as a food source, as medicine (for example, ergotamine), and in agricultural blight management.

Examples of fungi that form sclerotia are ergot (Claviceps purpurea), Polyporus tuberaster, Psilocybe mexicana, Agroathelia delphinii and many species in Sclerotiniaceae. Although not fungal, the plasmodium of slime molds can form sclerotia in adverse environmental conditions.

== Description ==
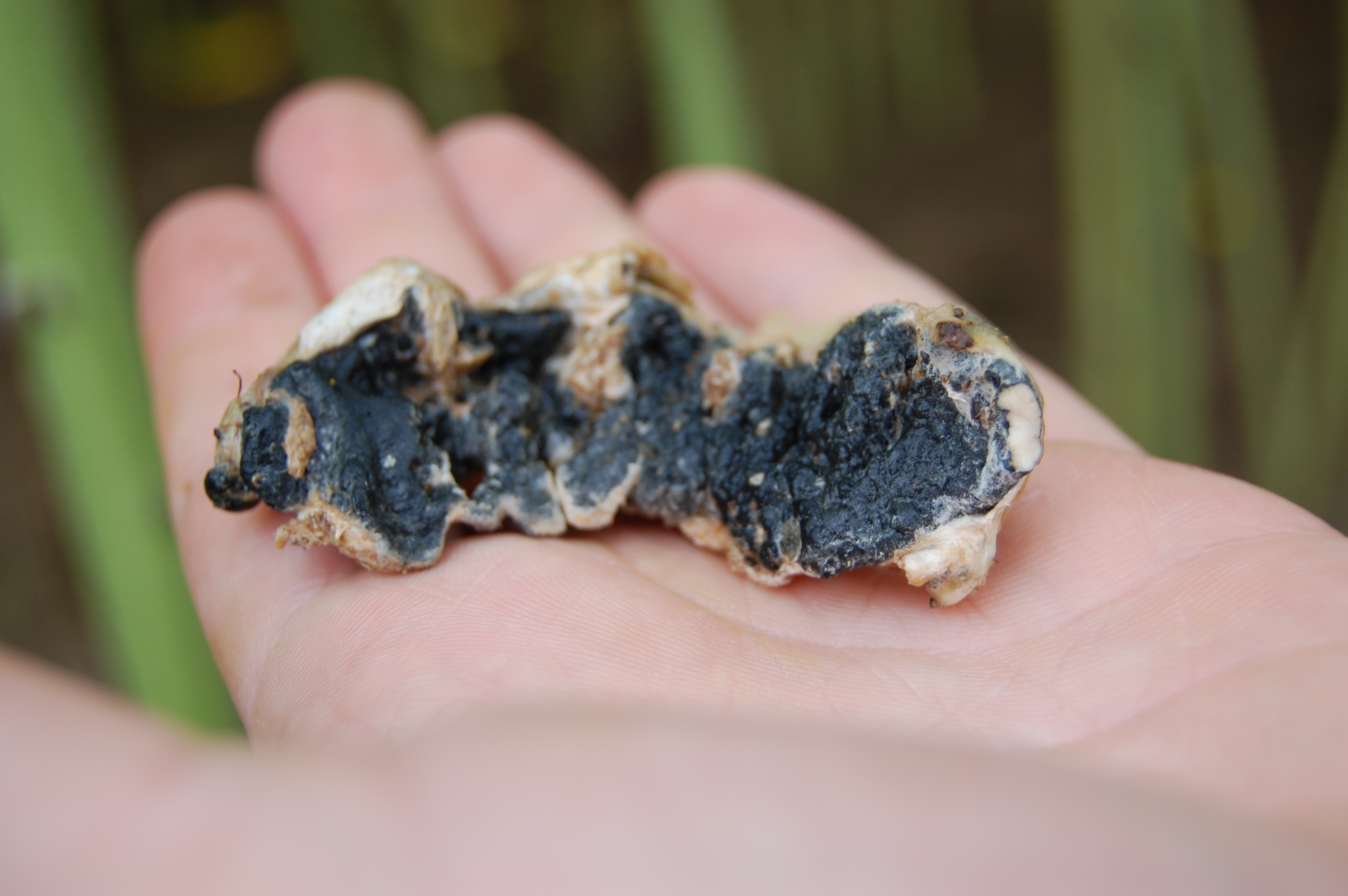
Sclerotinia sclerotiorum sclerotia

Sclerotia are often composed of a thick, dense shell with thick and dark cells and a core of thin colorless cells. Sclerotia are rich in hyphae emergency supplies, especially oil. They contain a very small amount of water (5–10%) and can survive in a dry environment for several years without losing the ability to grow. In most cases, the sclerotium consists exclusively of fungal hyphae, whereas some may consist partly of fungal hyphae plexus and partly in between tissues of the substrate (ergot, Sclerotinia). In favorable conditions, sclerotia germinate to form fruiting bodies (basidiomycetes) or mycelium with conidia (in imperfect fungi). Sclerotia sizes can range from a fraction of a millimeter to a few tens of centimeters as, for example Laccocephalum mylittae, which has sclerotia with diameters up to 30 cm and weighing up to 20 kg.

Sclerotia resemble cleistothecia in both their morphology and the genetic control of their development. This suggests the two structures may be homologous, sclerotia being vestigial cleistothecia that lost the capacity to produce ascospores.

== History ==
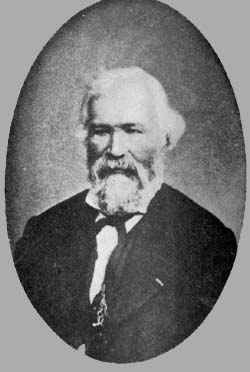
Sclerotia initially were mistaken for individual organisms and described as separate species until Louis René Tulasne proved in 1853 that sclerotia are only a stage in the life cycle of some fungi.

In the Middle Ages, Claviceps purpurea sclerotia-contaminated rye grain used in bread led to ergotism, by way of which thousands of people were killed and mutilated. The sclerotia contain alkaloids that cause paranoia and hallucinations, twitches, spasms, loss of peripheral sensation, edema and gangrene.

Louis René Tulasne discovered the relationship between infected rye plants and ergotism in the 19th century. With this discovery, more efforts were developed to reduce sclerotia from growing on rye and ergotism became rare. However, in 1879–1881 an outbreak developed in Germany, in 1926–1927 Russia was infected, and in 1977–1978 Ethiopia was infected.

Pleurotus tuber-regium, which forms edible sclerotia up to 30 cm wide, has a history of economic importance in Africa as food and as a medicinal mushroom.

== As part of fungal life cycles ==
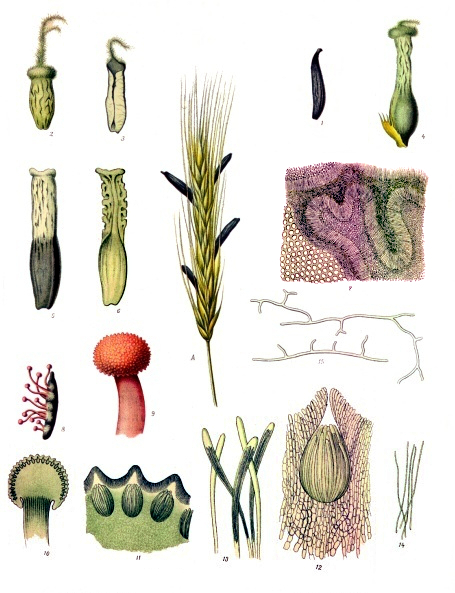
Various stages in the life cycle of Claviceps purpurea

For example, Claviceps purpurea sclerotia form and begin regrowth in the spring, infecting grass and rye plants by way of releasing their ascospores from perithecia. Claviceps purpurea can infect a wide variety of plants by infecting the ovaries. The fungal spores germinate at the anthesis and grow down the pollen tube without branching any hyphae outward. When the fungus reaches the bottom of the ovary, it leaves the pollen tube path and enters the vascular tissues where it branches its hypha. Approximately seven days into the infection, the mycelium produces conidia. The conidia are then secreted out of the plant in a sugary liquid that insects, attracted by the sugars, transfer to other plants. After two weeks of being infected by the fungus, the plant no longer generates the sugary liquid, and the fungus produces sclerotia. The sclerotium is an overwinter structure, which contains ergot alkaloids. Claviceps purpurea's life cycle is an interesting model for plant pathologists and cell biologists because:

- Strict organ specificity (ovaries)
- The plant lacks defense reactions
- Strict polar, oriented growth in the first infection stage
- Biotrophic life style

=== Formation ===
In fungi, there are three stages in the development of sclerotia:

1. Initial aggregation of hyphae;
2. Increase in size due to the growth and branching of hyphae;
3. Maturation with the formation of an outer coating that isolates the sclerotia from the surrounding environment, with the progressive dehydration of the hyphae and accumulation of reserve substances and pigments.

== As food ==
=== Pleurotus tuber-regium ===
Pleurotus tuber-regium, which forms edible sclerotia up to 30 cm wide, has a history of economic importance as food in Africa.

== Traditional medicine and hallucinogen ==
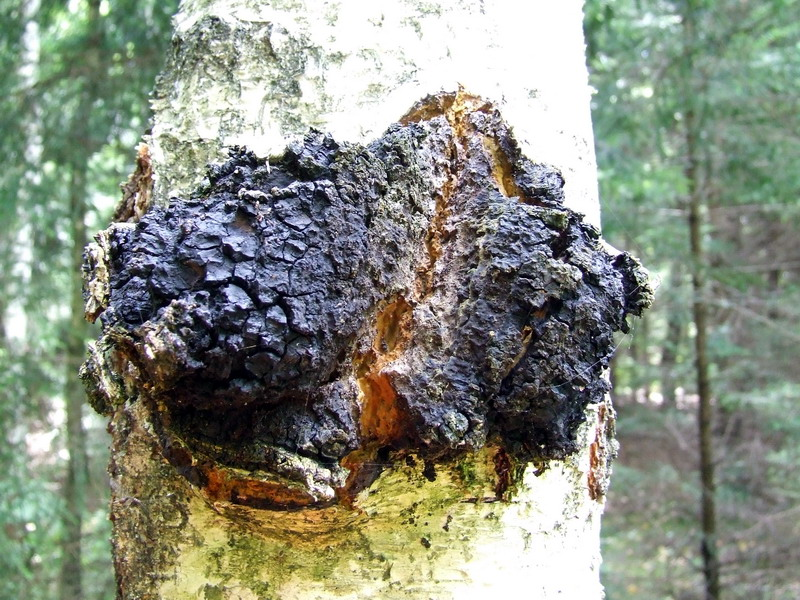
Inonotus obliquus (chaga) sclerotium growing on a birch tree

Over billions of years of Earth's history, organisms have acquired the ability to produce secondary metabolites – chemical compounds that afford protection from pathogens and ultraviolet light damage. Due to their exposure to a wide variety of environments, fungi have the ability to produce numerous such chemicals of potential value in traditional medicine.

=== Claviceps purpurea ===
In early times, ergot alkaloids have been used for folk medicine. For example, ergot was used as a form of abortion in Europe, but it led to hyper-contraction. In the 19th century, it was used to aid in the prevention of bleeding after childbirth and treatment for migraines and Parkinson's disease.

Acid hydrolysis is used to convert alkaloids, produced by the fungus Claviceps purpurea, into D-lysergic acid which is the starting material for many pharmaceutical and recreational drugs. In 1938 Albert Hofmann synthesized one of the strongest known hallucinogens, lysergic acid diethylamide (LSD), from ergot alkaloid. Despite side effects of the drug such as paranoia, loss of judgment and flashbacks, psychotherapists and psychiatrists used it to treat patients with neuroses, sexual dysfunctions and anxiety. In 1966, the United States government made LSD illegal. Recently, clinics have shown an interest in ergoline to treat patients with autism.

=== Ophiocordyceps sinensis ===
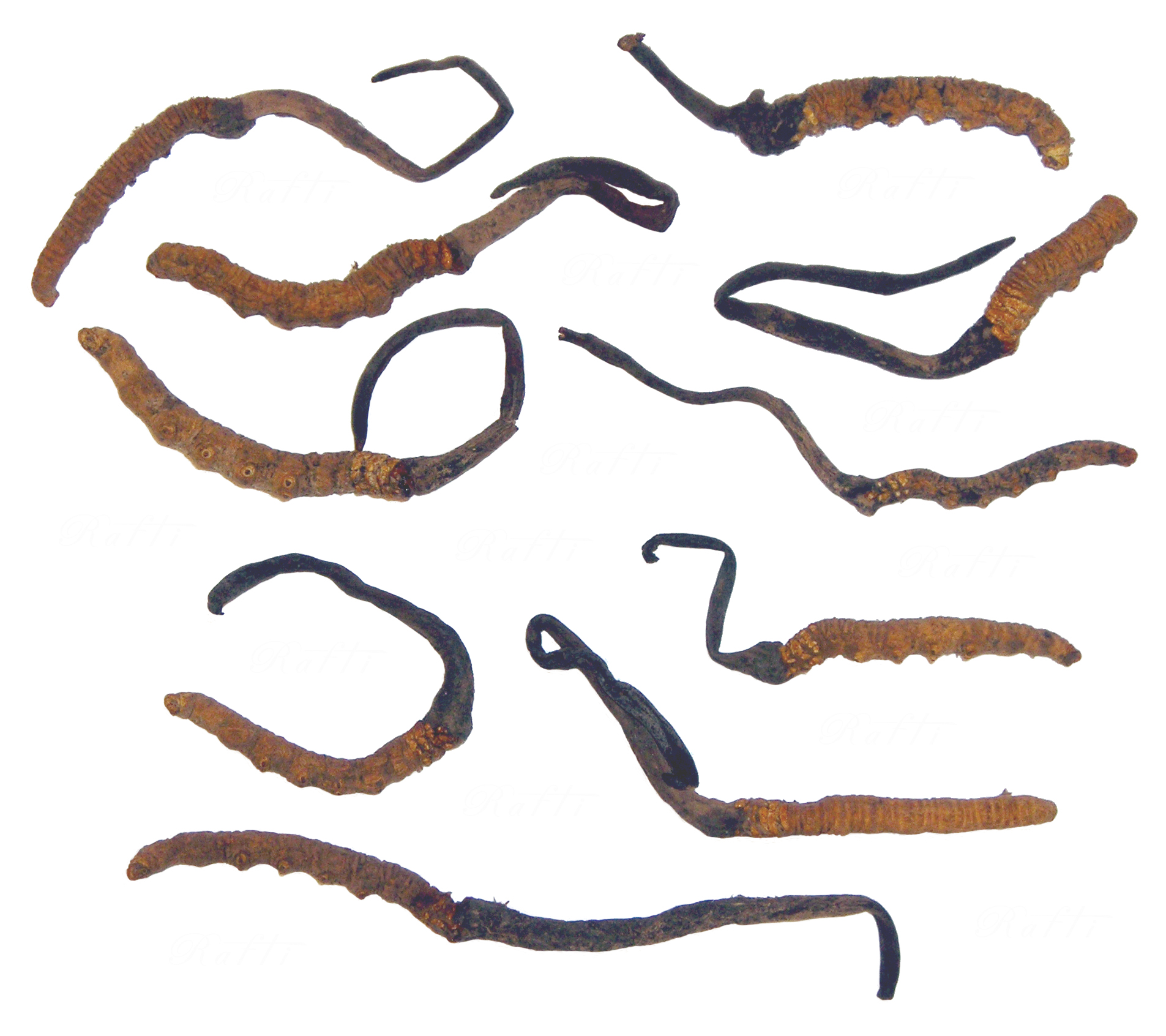
Caterpillars with emerging Ophiocordyceps sinensis

Ophiocordyceps sinensis (syn. Cordyceps sinensis) is a fungus which infects a caterpillar and uses its nutrients to create mycelia and a sclerotium. The fungus then sprouts out of the head of the caterpillar. In Chinese the fungus is known as Dōng chóng xià cǎo (Chinese: 冬虫夏草; lit. 'winter worm', 'summer grass').

=== Inonotus obliquus ===
Inonotus obliquus (chaga mushroom) is a sclerotium growing mostly on birch trees in northern climates. The tree sclerotium develops over the years as the mycelium uses nutrients from the living tree.

=== Psilocybe galindoi ===
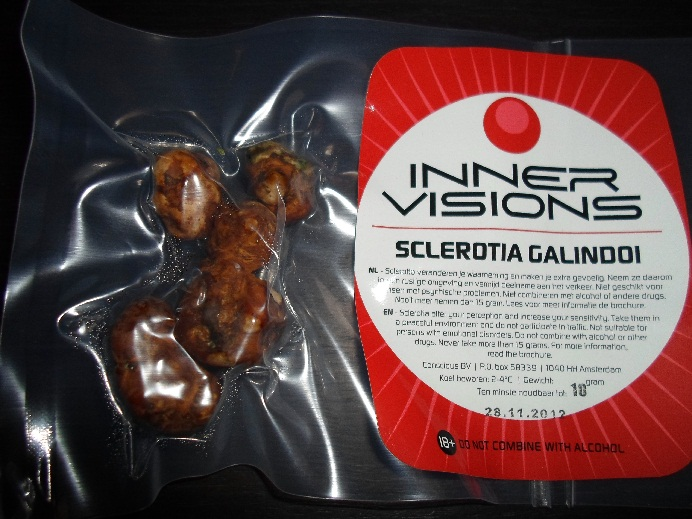
Psilocybe galindoi sclerotia

Certain grassland Psilocybe species have sclerotia to protect them from fire and from other disturbances. The sclerotia forming species contain, as many Psilocybe species do, the organic compounds psilocin and psilocybin.

=== Psilocybe mexicana and Psilocybe tampanensis ===
Sclerotia from Psilocybe mexicana and Psilocybe tampanensis also contain the active metabolites psilocin and psilocybin. These sclerotia can be bought at smartshops under different trade names such as "Philosopher's stone" or "truffles" and have the same hallucinogenic effect as magic mushrooms.

=== Wolfiporia hoelen ===
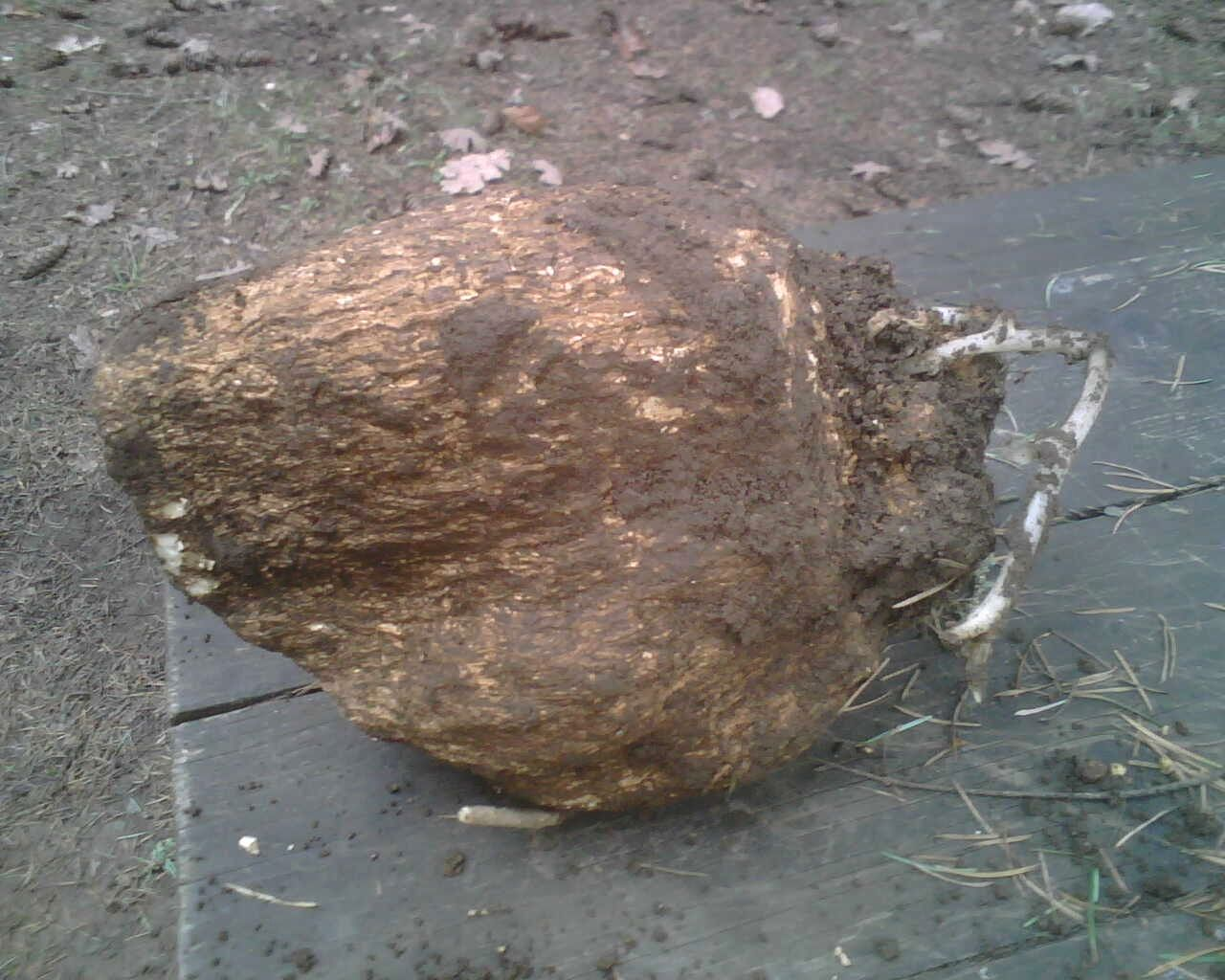
Edible Wolfiporia extensa sclerotium

Wolfiporia hoelen, often incorrectly named Poria cocos or Wolfiporia extensa, is used in traditional Chinese medicine.

Common names for it include hoelen, poria, tuckahoe, China root, fu ling (茯苓), fu shen (or fushen) and matsuhodo.

== Some species with sclerotia as agricultural pests ==
Many methods have been created to reduce the growth of agriculturally pathogenic sclerotia like changes in crop rotation, deeper ploughing and sifting out sclerotia. Fungicides, breeding disease resistance rye and cross breeding natural rye with hybrid rye have reduced C. purpurea infections.

Sclerotium cepavorum causes white rot in Allium species, particularly onions, leeks, and garlic. Worldwide, white rot is probably the most serious threat to Allium crop production of any disease.

Other fungi that produce sclerotia are prominent pathogens for canola crops. These and related fungi are generally controlled through the use of fungicides and crop rotation.

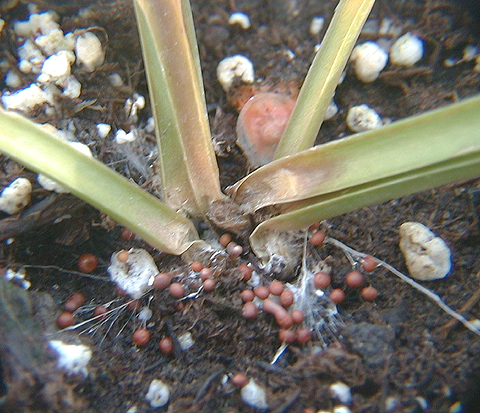
Sclerotium delphinii sclerotia on infected host

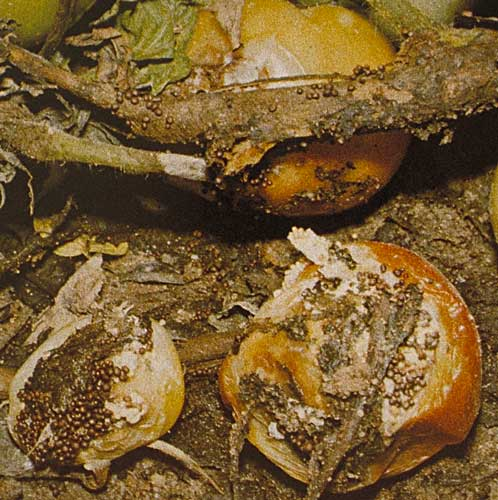
Agroathelia rolfsii sclerotia on Solanum lycopersicum (tomato)
