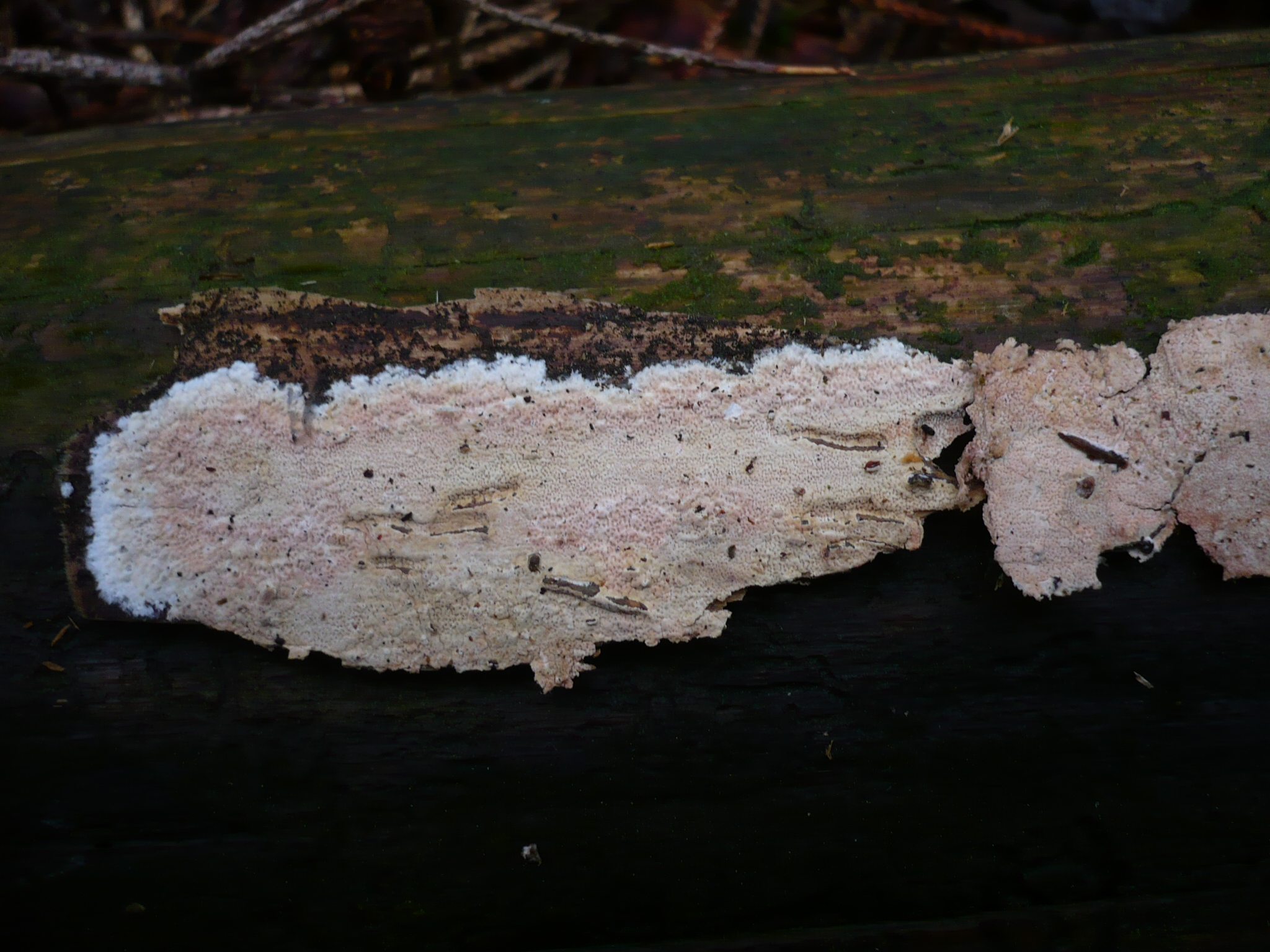
- Ceraceomyces sublaevis

Scientific classification
- Kingdom: Fungi
- Division: Basidiomycota
- Class: Agaricomycetes
- Subclass: Agaricomycetidae
- Order: Amylocorticiales; K.H.Larss., Manfr. Binder & Hibbett (2010)
- Family: Amylocorticiaceae; Jülich (1981)

Type genus
- Amylocorticium Pouzar (1959)

= Amylocorticiales =

Order of fungi

Amylocorticiales is an order of fungi in the class Agaricomycetes. The order was circumscribed in 2010 to contain mostly resupinate (crust-like) forms that have been referred to genera Anomoporia, Amyloathelia, Amylocorticiellum, Amylocorticium, Amyloxenasma, Anomoloma, Athelopsis, Ceraceomyces, Hypochniciellum, Leptosporomyces and Serpulomyces and the anomalous species, Athelia rolfsii, now classified in its own genus, Agroathelia.

== Phylogenetics ==
- - - - - - - - - - Anomoloma
                  - Hypnochniciellum molle
                - - - Plicaturopsis
                    - Irpicodon
                  - Ceraceomyces
              - - Amyloxenasma
                - Atheliopsis lacerata
            - Amylocorticium
          - - Podoserpula pusio
            - Amylocorticiellum
        - Anomoporia kamtschatica
      - Amyloathelia crassiuscula
    - Anomoporia
  - - Serpulomyces
    - Leptosporomyces septentrionalis

Phylogeny and relationships of Amylocorticiales ribosomal DNA sequences.

The order contains one of three assemblages of basal lineages of Agaricomycetidae that contain corticioid fungi; the others are the Jaapiales and the Atheliales. Although several molecular studies have confirmed the placement of the Amylocorticiales in the Agaricomycetidae, its relationship with other higher-level taxa is not known precisely. Depending on the loci used for analysis, the order is supported as sister group to the Agaricales, or as sister to a clade that contains the Agaricales, Boletales and Atheliales.

== Description ==
Species in the Amylocorticiales form fruit bodies that are effused (stretched out flat like a film-like growth), effused-reflexed (stretched out but with edges curled up) to almost pileate (with a cap), or stipitate (with a stipe). They have smooth hymenophores that can be either merulioid (wrinkled with low, uneven ridges), irpicoid (with "teeth") or poroid (with pores). The hyphal system is monomitic (containing only generative hyphae) and all hyphae are nodose-septate (with nodes and septa). The cystidia are rare and when present, are tube-like and often nodose-septate. The basidia (spore-bearing cells) are mostly terminal but in one genus borne laterally on horizontal hyphae (pleurobasidia), invariably producing four spores. The basidiospores are smooth, thin-walled or thick-walled, ellipsoid, cylindrical or allantoid (sausage-shaped), in most species amyloid. Taxa that do not exhibit amyloid reactions include Agroathelia, Ceraceomyces, Podoserpula, Serpulomyces and Leptosporomyces septentrionalis. Species are saprobic on decaying wood or as plant parasites. Amylocorticiales typically cause brown rot or white rot. Agroathelia (often called Sclerotium rolfsii) is a major plant pathogen of field crops

== Genera ==
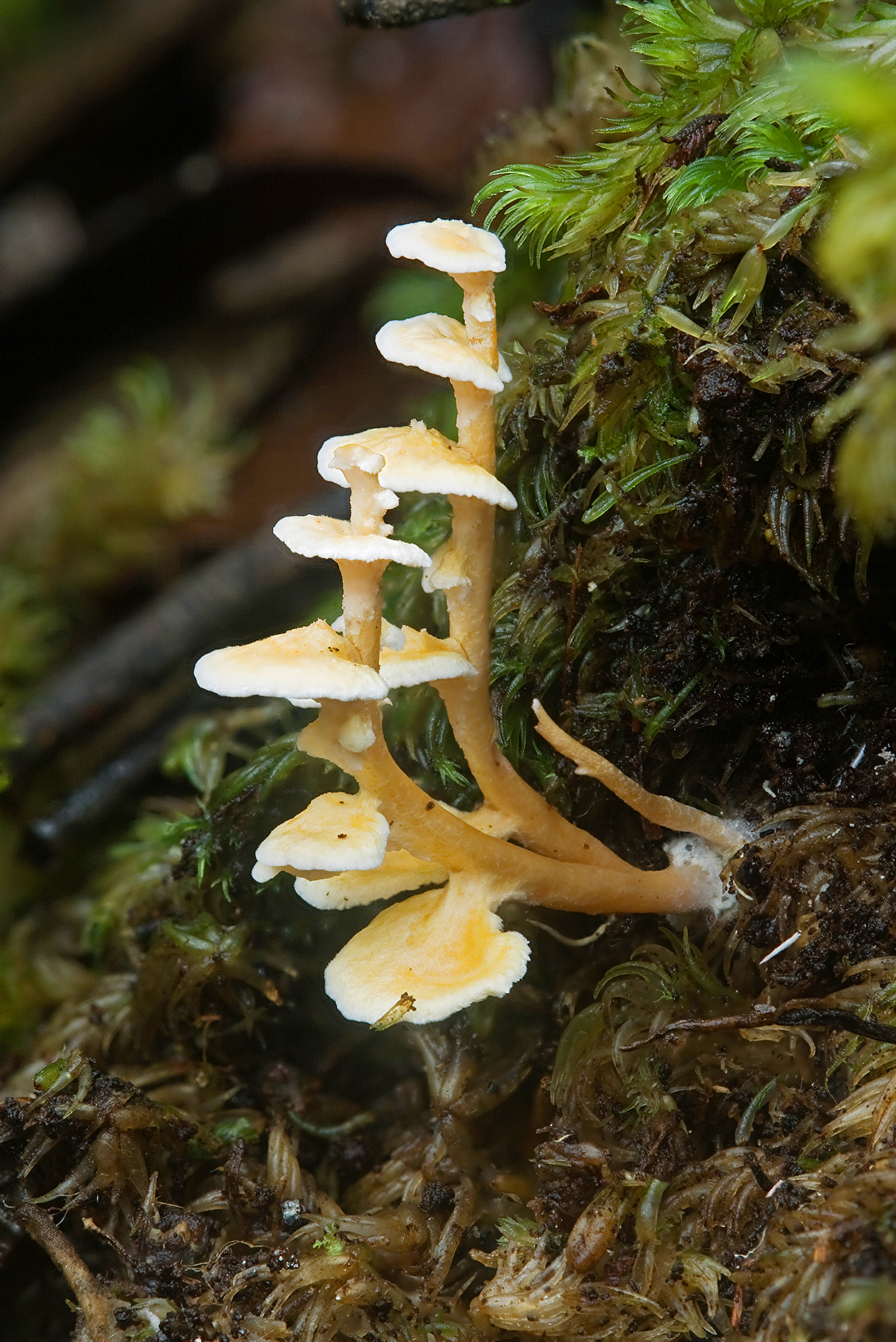
Podoserpula pusio is an exception to the typically resupinate fruit body form characteristic of the Amylocorticiales.

- Agroathelia
- Anomoporia
- Amyloathelia
- Amylocorticiellum
- Amylocorticium
- Amyloxenasma
- Anomoloma
- Athelopsis
- Ceraceomyces
- Hypochniciellum
- Leptosporomyces
- Plicatura
- Podoserpula
- Serpulomyces
