= Václav Melzer =

Czech mycologist (1878–1968)

- Born: 26 August 1878; Wilkischen, Bohemia, Austria-Hungary
- Died: 1 May 1968 (aged 89); Domažlice, Czechoslovakia
- Known for: Contributions to the taxonomy of Russula. Formulation of Melzer's reagent.
- Children: 2 (died in early adulthood)
- Scientific career
- Fields: Mycology
- Author abbrev. (botany): Melzer

Václav Melzer (26 August 1878 – 1 May 1968) was a Czech mycologist and schoolteacher, best known for his studies of the genus Russula and for his formulation of Melzer's reagent, an important histological testing solution in mycology.

== Life and career ==
Melzer was born on 26 August 1878 in Wilkischen, Bohemia, Austria-Hungary (now Vlkýš, part of Heřmanova Huť in the Czech Republic), the son of a teacher. The family soon relocated to Elstin (now Lštění, part of Blížejov), near to Taus (later Domažlice). Except for his attendance at the Male Teacher Training Institute in Pilsen (Mužský učitelský ústav Plzeň), he would spend the remainder of his life in Domažlice and nearby villages. After graduating from the teacher training institute in 1901, he served as an upper level elementary school teacher in the Domažlice district until his retirement from teaching in 1938.

Melzer was not a university-educated biologist by profession, but rather a schoolteacher with a strong interest in biology and natural history. This career trajectory mirrored that of other early Czech mycologists such as František Tyttl, Rudolf Veselý, and Jindřich Kučera. He was interested in natural sciences from a young age and was a devoted autodidact. While at the teacher's college, he also devoted himself to the study of botany, and showed an early interest in mosses and lichens. In 1908, he began to devote himself to the study of mushrooms. In 1913, he read René Maire’s work on Russula, and was soon carrying out his own scientific work on this genus. He would eventually closely collaborate with another Czech Russula specialist, Jaroslav Zvára, and in 1927, they would publish České holubinky [Czech Russulas], the first Czech monograph of this genus. This work would prove influential beyond Czechoslovakia, and a shortened version in French was published by the Société mycologique de France in 1929. His work on Russula would be a considerable influence on subsequent work on this genus by mycologists such as Rolf Singer, Julius Schaeffer, and Henri Romagnesi, all of whom actively corresponded with Melzer.

His discoveries in this genus included Russula helodes, described in 1929 from collections made by Rudolf Veselý in a peat bog in the Soběslav area of South Bohemia. R. velenovskyi was first described by Melzer and Zvára in their 1927 monograph and named for the Czech mycologist Josef Velenovský. Velenovský in turn had previously named the bolete species Boletus melzeri in his honor in 1922, which was initially collected by Melzer in 1920 at Čechtice. Other taxa named after Melzer include the species Russula melzeri (published in his 1927 monograph, but formally authored by Zvára), R. lilacea var. melzeriana (now R. melzeriana), and Lentinus melzeri. The genera Melzericium and Melzerodontia are also named in his honor.

Melzer is perhaps best-known in mycology for developing the histological staining solution Melzer's reagent, which he developed in 1924, likely a modification of an older chloral hydrate-containing iodine solution developed by the botanist Arthur Meyer. Melzer had originally used the reagent (which he referred to as "jodkalichloral" (potassium iodide-chloral) in his 1927 monograph) to study the ornamentation on surface of basidiospores in Russula, which gives a strong amyloid reaction in Melzer's reagent, highlighting their shape, which of great taxonomic significance in Russula and other genera in the Russulales. However, other mycologists soon experimented with the compound to test reactions in a wide variety of microanatomical structures in the asco- and basidiomycetes, and the formulation, often simply called "Melzer's", became a standard diagnostic agent in mycological microscopy.

Melzer's reagent was one of several reagents used by Melzer for the macro- and micromorphological characterization of Russula. Another protocol that Melzer pioneered within mycology was the use of a variation on Ziehl–Neelsen staining, in which certain types of encrusted hyphae would maintain a carbol fuchsin stain even after clearing with a strong acid. Melzer called these hyphae "primordial hyphae", based on the idea that this type of hyphae were a remnant of from the early primordium stage of the Russula fruiting body. Melzer was also responsible for the development of chemical tests that were used in the macromorphological identification of fresh mushroom specimens, such as the use of an aqueous ferrous sulfate solution for staining the fruiting body in Russula species.

== Family ==
Melzer was married twice, but his first wife and both daughters had died by 1937, his daughters dying at the ages of 18 and 20. Melzer retired from teaching in 1938, and remarried that same year. His second wife was described in his obituary as a "devoted life partner and collaborator...who was his support, especially in his old age."

== Legacy ==
Melzer's personal papers, drafts, correspondence, mushroom paintings and other materials were compiled and archived following his death. The collection was originally housed at the Chodsko Museum in Domažlice, but in 1977 the collection was transferred to the Botanical Department of the West Bohemian Museum in Pilsen. Melzer was also a major contributor of fungal specimens in the department's herbarium collection.
