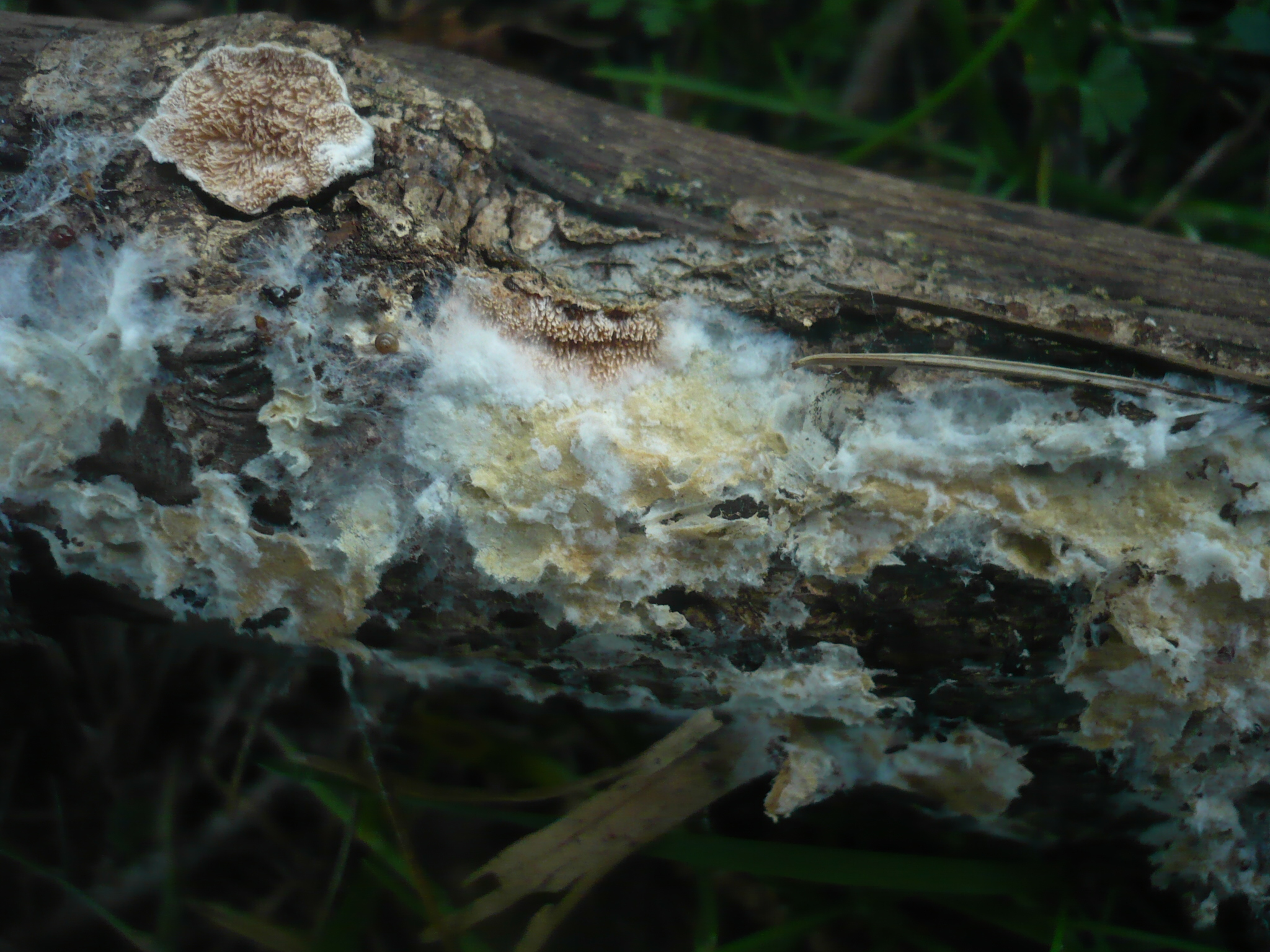

Scientific classification
- Domain: Eukaryota
- Kingdom: Fungi
- Division: Basidiomycota
- Class: Agaricomycetes
- Order: Atheliales
- Family: Atheliaceae
- Genus: Amphinema
- Species: A. byssoides

Binomial name
- Amphinema byssoides (Pers.) J.Erikss. (1958)
- Synonyms
click to expand
- Corticium strigosum var. filamentosum W.G.Sm.
- Auricularia byssoides (Pers.) Mérat
- Kneiffia tomentella Bres.
- Amphinema byssoides var. macrospora Dhingra & Avn.P.Singh
- Athelia strigosa var. muscigena Pers.
- Coniophora byssoides (Pers.) P.Karst.
- Athelia lanuginosa Pers.
- Diplonema sordescens P.Karst.
- Peniophora byssoides subsp. tomentella (Bres.) Bourdot & Galzin
- Hypochnus obducens (P.Karst.) Sacc.
- Amphinema tomentellum (Bres.) M.P.Christ.
- Kneiffia byssoides (Pers.) Herter
- Peniophora tomentella (Bres.) Bres.
- Polyporus tenax Velen.
- Thelephora byssoides Pers.
- Amphinema sordescens (P.Karst.) P.Karst.
- Peniophora byssoides (Pers.) Höhn. & Litsch.
- Himantia byssoides (Pers.) Fr.
- Corticium byssoides (Pers.) Fr.
- Peniophora sordescens (P.Karst.) Sacc.
- Coniophorella byssoides (Pers.) Bres.
- Tomentella obducens P.Karst.
- Corticium lacunosum Berk. & Broome
- Hypochnus lacunosus (Berk. & Broome) Sacc.
- Hypochnus byssoides (Pers.) Quél.

= Amphinema byssoides =

Species of fungus

Amphinema byssoides (cratered duster) is a species of corticioid fungus known to form mycorrhizal relationships with spruce trees.

It was first described as Thelephora byssoides in 1801 by Christiaan Hendrik Persoon, but was transferred to the genus Amphinema by John Eriksson in 1958.
