= Fibularhizoctonia =

Scientific classification
- Kingdom: Fungi
- Division: Basidiomycota
- Class: Agaricomycetes
- Order: Atheliales
- Family: Atheliaceae
- Genus: Fibularhizoctonia; G.C. Adams & Kropp (1996)

Species
- F. carotae; F. centrifuga; F. psychrophila; (F. sp. TMB)

Synonyms
- "Fibulorhizoctonia" orth. var.

Genus of fungi

Fibularhizoctonia is a genus of fungus in the Atheliaceae family. The genus, circumscribed in 1996, contains three widespread species that are anamorphs of Athelia.

The genome sequences of two species of Fibularhizoctonia have been described: F. psychrophila in 2008 and the "cockoo fungus" (F. sp. TMB) in 2021.

== Species ==
One unnamed species of Fibularhizoctonia is commonly known as the cuckoo fungus because it makes termite balls, sclerotia that mimic termite eggs. The name Athelia termitophila sp. nov. has been proposed for the teleomorph of termite balls. This species is otherwise usually known as F. sp. TMB.
