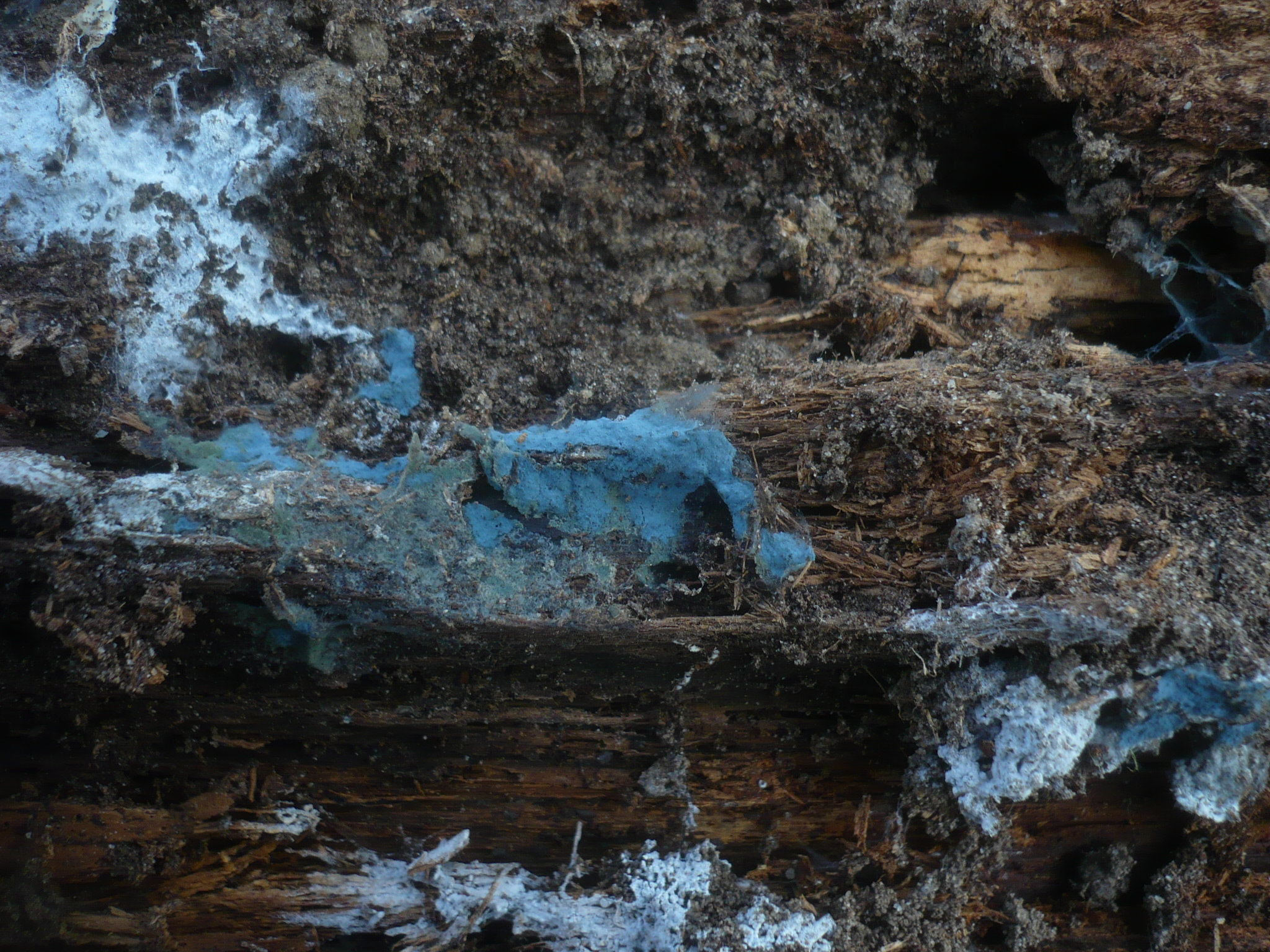

Scientific classification
- Kingdom: Fungi
- Division: Basidiomycota
- Class: Agaricomycetes
- Order: Atheliales
- Family: Atheliaceae
- Genus: Byssocorticium
- Species: B. atrovirens

Binomial name
- Byssocorticium atrovirens Bondartsev & Singer

Synonyms
- List: Byssocorticium atrivirens (Fr.: Fr.) Bondartsev & Singer; Coniophora atrovirens (Fr.) Cooke; Corticium atrovirens Fr.; Corticium atrovirens (Fr.) Fr.; Lyomyces atrovirens (Fr.: Fr.) P.Karst.; Lyomyces atrovirens (Fr.) P. Karst.; Terana atrovirens (Fr.) Kuntze; Thelephora atrovirens Fr. (Originally described as such); Hypochnus atrovirens (Fr.) Donk; Corticium atrovirens var. caerulescens (P. Karst.) Jaap; Corticium caerulescens (P. Karst.) Sacc.; Hypochnopsis caerulescens (P. Karst.) P. Karst.; Lyomyces caerulescens P. Karst.; Terana caerulescens (P. Karst.) Kuntze; Sporotrichum aeruginosum Schwein.

= Byssocorticium atrovirens =

Species of fungus

Byssocorticum atrovirens is a species of corticoid fungus in the family Atheliaceae. It is found primarily in eastern North America and Europe, as well as on the West Coast of the United States. The basidiocarp, or fruiting body, is web-like and is initially bright blue before darkening and becoming greener. The mycorrhizas are paler but overall similar in structure and color.
