= Lyoathelia =

Scientific classification
- Kingdom: Fungi
- Division: Basidiomycota
- Class: Agaricomycetes
- Order: Atheliales
- Family: Atheliaceae
- Genus: Lyoathelia; Hjortstam & Ryvarden (2004)

Type species
- Lyoathelia laxa (Burt) Hjortstam & Ryvarden (2004)

Synonyms
- Peniophora laxa Burt (1926); Athelia laxa (Burt) Jülich (1972); Hyphodontia laxa (Burt) Y.Hayashi (1974)

Genus of fungi

Lyoathelia is a fungal genus in the family Atheliaceae. The genus is monotypic, containing the single corticioid (crust-like) species Lyoathelia laxa. Originally found in Canada, it is now known to occur as well in the United States and Japan.
