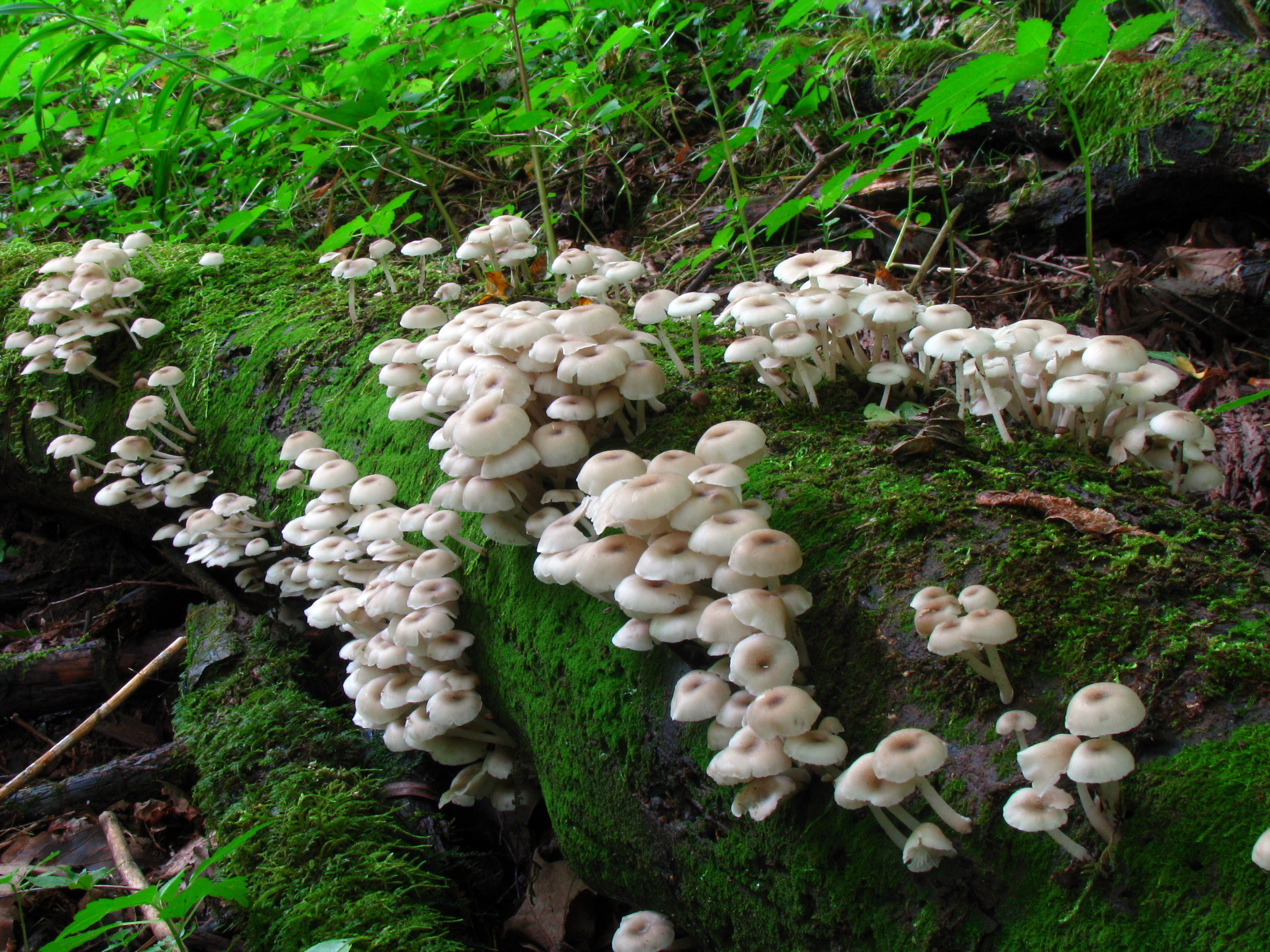
- Clitocybula abundans

Scientific classification
- Kingdom: Fungi
- Division: Basidiomycota
- Class: Agaricomycetes
- Order: Agaricales
- Family: Porotheleaceae
- Genus: Clitocybula (Singer) Singer ex Métrod (1952)

Type species
- Clitocybula lacerata (Scop.) Singer ex Métrod (1952)

Synonyms
- Fayodia subgen. Clitocybula Singer (1943)

= Clitocybula =

Genus of fungi

Clitocybula is a genus of mushroom-forming fungi in the family Porotheleaceae but was originally classified within Marasmiaceae. The genus was circumscribed by Georges Métrod in 1952. Species in the genus are commonly known as "coincaps".

== Description ==
Clitocybula fruit bodies are small- to medium-sized, with a morphology ranging from clitocyboid, collybioid, mycenoid, pleurotoid, to omphalinoid. Gills are decurrent, and the stipe is cylindrical and equal in width throughout its length. Clitocybula spores are smooth, ellipsoid to roughly spherical in shape, hyaline (translucent), and mostly amyloid (staining with Melzer's reagent).

== Species ==
Image	Name	Distribution
	Clitocybula abundans (Peck) Singer 1954	North America
	Clitocybula azurea Singer 1973	Brazil and Venezuela
	Clitocybula canariensis Barrasa, Esteve-Rav. & Dähncke 2006	Canary Islands
	Clitocybula ellipsospora N Santamaria, L Rubio-Casas, JC Zamora 2022	Iberian Peninsula
	Clitocybula esculenta Nagas. & Redhead 1988	Japan
	Clitocybula familia (Peck) Singer 1954	North America, Europe
	Clitocybula globispora (Raithelh.) Raithelh. 1983	
	Clitocybula grisella (G.Stev. & G.M.Taylor) E.Horak 1971	
	Clitocybula lacerata (Scop.) Métrod 1952	United Kingdom
	Clitocybula mellea Singer 1954	
	Clitocybula oculata (Murrill) H.E.Bigelow 1973	
	Clitocybula oculus (Peck) Singer 1962	North America
	Clitocybula omphaliiformis Pegler 1977	
	Clitocybula paropsis Raithelh. 1990	
	Clitocybula striata Dähncke, Contu & Vizzini 2010	
	Clitocybula tarnensis (Speg.) Singer 1954	
	Clitocybula tilieti (Singer) Singer 1962	

== See also ==
- List of Agaricales genera
- List of Marasmiaceae genera
