= Elaphocephala =

Scientific classification
- Kingdom: Fungi
- Division: Basidiomycota
- Class: Agaricomycetes
- Order: Atheliales
- Family: Atheliaceae
- Genus: Elaphocephala; Pouzar (1983)
- Species: E. iocularis

Binomial name
- Elaphocephala iocularis Pouzar (1983)

Genus of fungi

Elaphocephala is a fungal genus in the family Atheliaceae. The genus is monotypic, containing the single resupinate (crust-like) species Elaphocephala iocularis, found in Europe.
