= Butlerelfia =

Scientific classification
- Kingdom: Fungi
- Division: Basidiomycota
- Class: Agaricomycetes
- Order: Atheliales
- Family: Atheliaceae
- Genus: Butlerelfia; Weresub & Illman (1980)

Type species
- Butlerelfia eustacei Weresub & Illman (1980)

Genus of fungi

Butlerelfia is a fungal genus in the family Atheliaceae. The genus is monotypic, containing the single corticioid species Butlerelfia eustacei, recorded from Europe and Canada. The species causes fisheye rot of refrigerated apples. The binomial honors H. J. Eustace and L. F. Butler, who first described the species under the name Corticium centrifugum.

== See also ==
- List of apple diseases
