= Pteridomyces =

Scientific classification
- Kingdom: Fungi
- Division: Basidiomycota
- Class: Agaricomycetes
- Order: Atheliales
- Family: Atheliaceae
- Genus: Pteridomyces; Jülich (1979)

Type species
- Pteridomyces galzinii (Bres.) Jülich (1979)

Species
- P. bisporus P. galzinii P. lacteus P. roseolus

Synonyms
- Athelopsis subgen. Pteridomyces (Jülich) Hjortstam (1998)

Genus of fungi

Pteridomyces is a genus of corticioid fungi in the family Atheliaceae.
