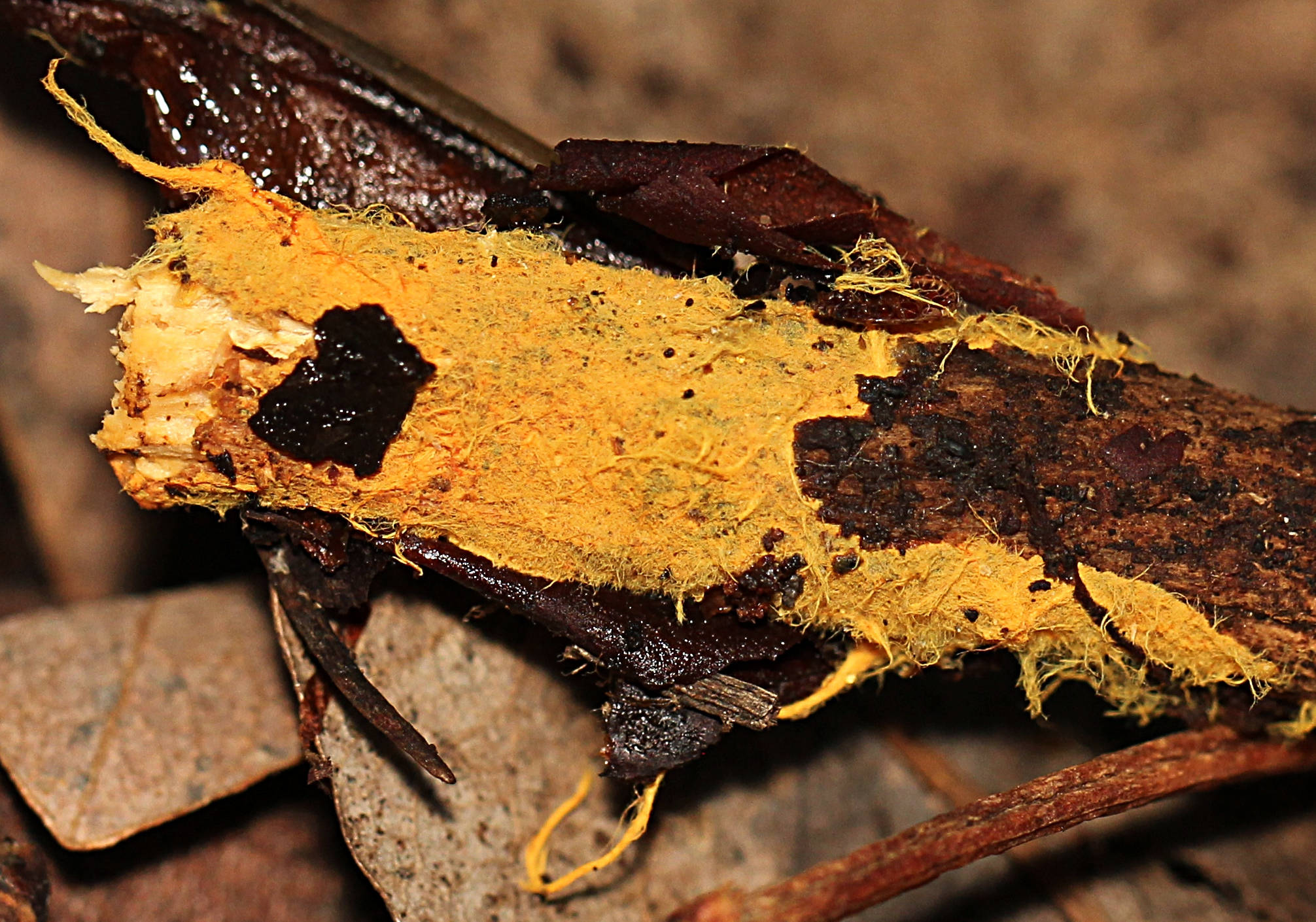
- Piloderma bicolor

Scientific classification
- Kingdom: Fungi
- Division: Basidiomycota
- Class: Agaricomycetes
- Order: Atheliales
- Family: Atheliaceae
- Genus: Piloderma; Jülich (1969)

Type species
- Piloderma bicolor (Peck) Jülich (1969)

Species
- Piloderma bicolor Piloderma byssinum Piloderma lanatum Piloderma lapillicola Piloderma olivaceum Piloderma sphaerosporum

= Piloderma =

Genus of fungi

Piloderma is a genus of fungi in the family Atheliaceae. The distinguishing characteristics of Piloderma are the thick-walled (roughly 0.25 μm) basidiospores, the club-shaped basidia with stalk-like bases, and the clampless-septate hyphae. The widespread genus contains six species.

== Ecology ==
Piloderma is known to be a key ectomycorrhizal species in conifer forests, assisting in nitrogen recycling and assimilation.
