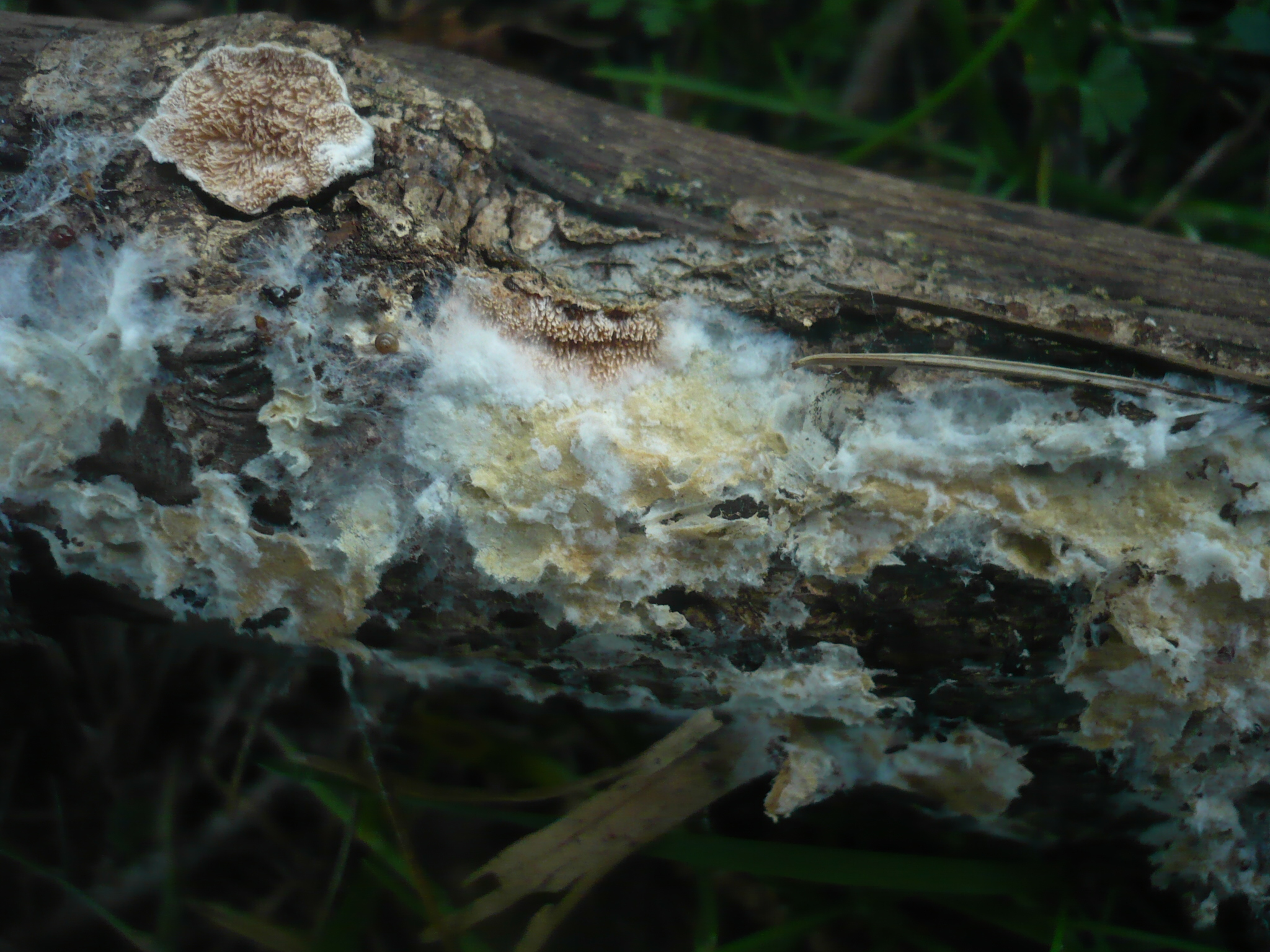
- Amphinema byssoides

Scientific classification
- Kingdom: Fungi
- Division: Basidiomycota
- Class: Agaricomycetes
- Order: Atheliales
- Family: Atheliaceae
- Genus: Amphinema; P.Karst. (1892)

Type species
- Amphinema sordescens (P.Karst.) P.Karst. (1893)

Species
- Amphinema angustispora Amphinema arachispora Amphinema byssoides Amphinema diadema Amphinema sordescens Amphinema tomentellum

Synonyms
- Diplonema P.Karst. (1889); Sphaerophora Bonord. (1870)

= Amphinema (fungus) =

Genus of fungi

Amphinema is a genus of corticioid fungi in the family Atheliaceae. The widespread genus contains six species.
