= Fibulomyces =

Scientific classification
- Domain: Eukaryota
- Kingdom: Fungi
- Division: Basidiomycota
- Class: Agaricomycetes
- Order: Atheliales
- Family: Atheliaceae
- Genus: Fibulomyces; Jülich

Genus of fungi

Fibulomyces is a genus of fungi belonging to the family Atheliaceae.

The genus has cosmopolitan distribution.

Species:

- Fibulomyces canadensis Jülich
- Fibulomyces cystoideus Dhingra
- Fibulomyces fusoideus Jülich
- Fibulomyces mutabilis (Bres.) Jülich
