= Mycostigma =

Scientific classification
- Kingdom: Fungi
- Division: Basidiomycota
- Class: Agaricomycetes
- Order: Atheliales
- Family: Atheliaceae
- Genus: Mycostigma; Jülich (1976)

Type species
- Mycostigma aegeritoides (Bourdot & Galzin) Jülich (1976)

Synonyms
- Corticium aegeritoides Bourdot & Galzin (1911)

Genus of fungi

Mycostigma is a genus of fungi in the family Atheliaceae. The genus is monotypic, containing the single species Mycostigma aegeritoides, found in Europe.
