= Athelocystis =

Scientific classification
- Kingdom: Fungi
- Division: Basidiomycota
- Class: Agaricomycetes
- Order: Atheliales
- Family: Atheliaceae
- Genus: Athelocystis; Hjortstam & Ryvarden (2010)

Type species
- Athelocystis capitata Hjortstam & Ryvarden (2010)

Genus of fungi

Athelocystis is a genus of fungi in the family Atheliaceae. The genus is monotypic, containing the single species Athelocystis capitata, found in Brazil.
