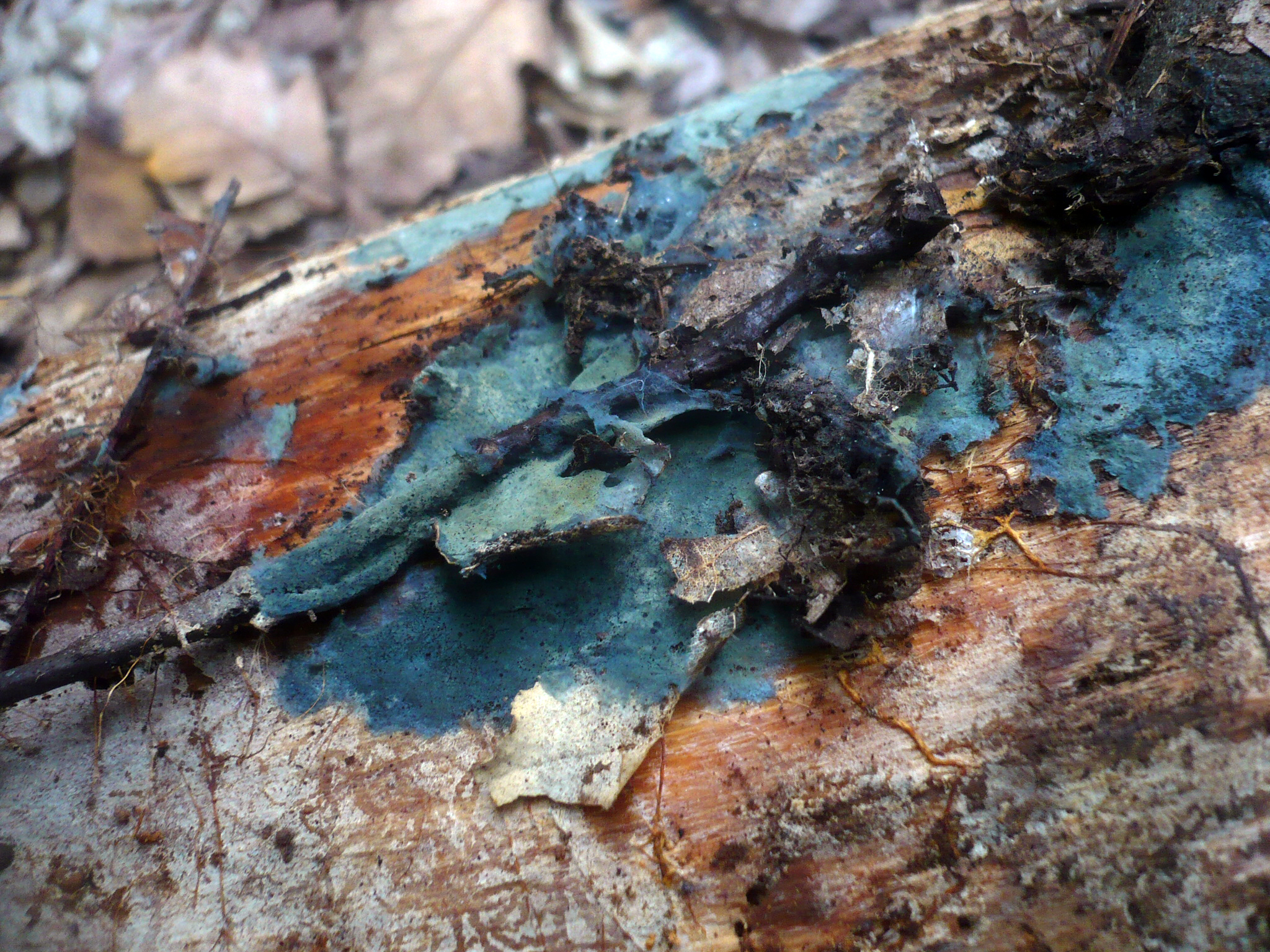
- Byssocorticium atrovirens

Scientific classification
- Kingdom: Fungi
- Division: Basidiomycota
- Class: Agaricomycetes
- Order: Atheliales
- Family: Atheliaceae
- Genus: Byssocorticium; Bondartsev & Singer ex Singer (1944)

Type species
- Byssocorticium atrovirens (Fr.) Bondartsev & Singer ex Singer (1944)

Species
- B. atrovirens; B. californicum; B. caeruleum; B. efibulatum; B. lutescens; B. naviculare; B. neomexicanum; B. pulchrum

Synonyms
- Byssocorticium Bondartsev & Singer (1941)

= Byssocorticium =

Genus of fungi

Byssocorticium is a genus of corticioid fungi in the family Atheliaceae. The widespread genus contains 9 species.
