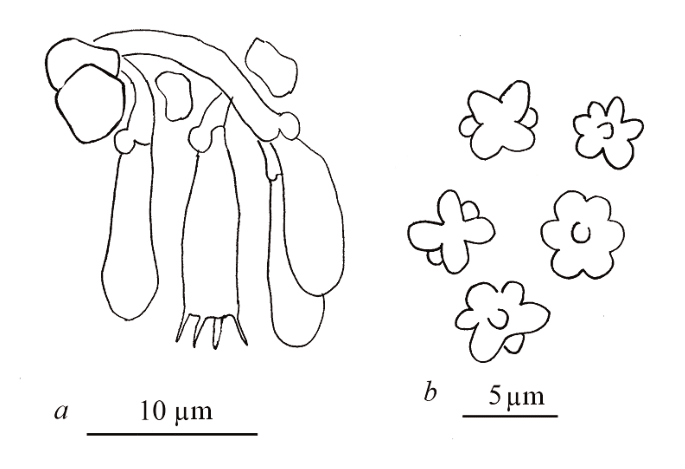
- Lobulicium occultum: a – basidium and basidioles; b – basidiospores

Scientific classification
- Kingdom: Fungi
- Division: Basidiomycota
- Class: Agaricomycetes
- Order: Atheliales
- Family: Atheliaceae
- Genus: Lobulicium; K.H.Larss. & Hjortstam (1982)

Type species
- Lobulicium occultum K.H.Larss. & Hjortstam (1982)

= Lobulicium =

Genus of fungi

Lobulicium is a fungal genus in the family Atheliaceae. The genus is monotypic, containing the single species Lobulicium occultum, found in Europe. The fungus produces small, crust-like (resupinate) fruit bodies on decayed wood. Its spores are thin-walled, and have seven lobes.
