= Taeniospora =

Scientific classification
- Kingdom: Fungi
- Division: Basidiomycota
- Class: Agaricomycetes
- Order: Atheliales
- Family: Atheliaceae
- Genus: Taeniospora; Marvanová (1977)

Type species
- Taeniospora gracilis Marvanová (1977)

Species
- T. gracilis T. nasifera

Genus of fungi

Taeniospora is a genus of anamorphic fungi in the family Atheliaceae. The genus contains two species that have been recorded from the Czech Republic.
