= Athelicium =

Scientific classification
- Kingdom: Fungi
- Division: Basidiomycota
- Class: Agaricomycetes
- Order: Atheliales
- Family: Atheliaceae
- Genus: Athelicium; K.H.Larss. & Hjortstam (1986)

Type species
- Athelicium stridii K.H.Larss. & Hjortstam (1986)

Species
- A. stridii A. hallenbergii

Genus of fungi

Athelicium is a genus of corticioid fungi in the family Atheliaceae. The genus contains two species known from Europe.
