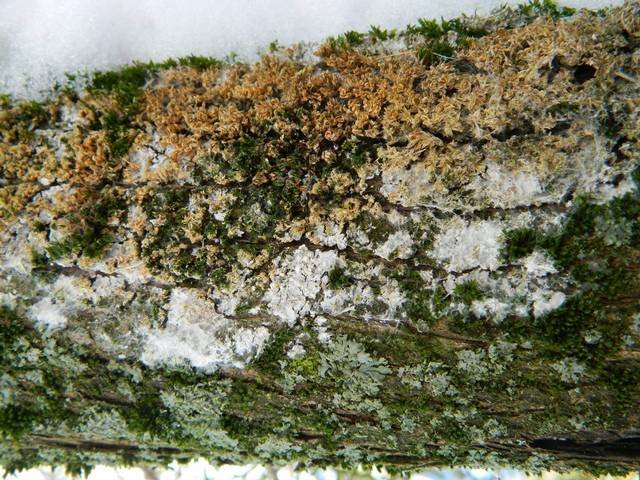
- Athelia arachnoidea growing on Thuja orientalis in Lasi, Romania

Scientific classification
- Kingdom: Fungi
- Division: Basidiomycota
- Class: Agaricomycetes
- Order: Atheliales
- Family: Atheliaceae
- Genus: Athelia
- Species: A. arachnoidea

Binomial name
- Athelia arachnoidea (Berk.) Jülich, (1972)

Synonyms
- Corticium arachnoideum Berk.; Terana arachnoidea (Berk.) Kuntze; Athelia epiphylla var. arachnoidea (Berk.) Krieglst.; Hypochnus bisporus J. Schröt.; Corticium bisporum (J. Schröt.) Bourdot & Galzin; Corticium centrifugum subsp. bisporum (J. Schröt.) Bourdot & Galzin; Athelia bispora (J. Schröt.) Donk; Rhizoctonia carotae Rader (anamorph); Fibularhizoctonia carotae (Rader) G.C. Adams, & Kropp (anamorph)

= Athelia arachnoidea =

Species of fungus

Athelia arachnoidea is a corticioid fungus in the family Atheliaceae. The species forms thin, white, cobwebby basidiocarps (fruit bodies) and typically occurs saprotrophically on leaf litter and fallen wood. It can, however, also be a facultative parasite of lichens and can additionally be a plant pathogen (typically found in its asexual Fibularhizoctonia carotae state), causing "crater rot" of stored carrots.
