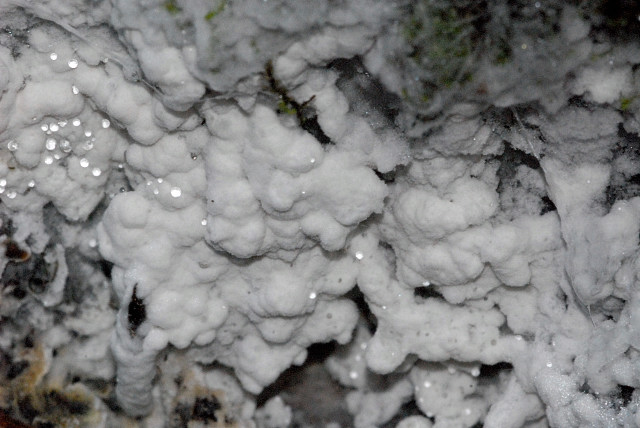
- Athelia neuhoffii

Scientific classification
- Kingdom: Fungi
- Division: Basidiomycota
- Class: Agaricomycetes
- Order: Atheliales
- Family: Atheliaceae
- Genus: Athelia; Pers. (1818)

Type species
- Athelia epiphylla Pers. (1818)

= Athelia (fungus) =

Genus of fungi

Athelia is a genus of corticioid fungi in the family Atheliaceae. Some species are facultative parasites of plants (including crops) and of lichens. The widespread genus contains 28 species. However, Athelia rolfsii was found to belong in the Amylocorticiales in a molecular phylogenetics study and renamed Agroathelia rolfsii.

== Species ==
- Athelia acrospora
- Athelia alnicola
- Athelia alutacea
- Athelia andina
- Athelia arachnoidea
- Athelia bambusae
- Athelia binucleospora
- Athelia bombacina
- Athelia decipiens
- Athelia fibulata
- Athelia macularis
- Athelia neuhoffii
- Athelia nivea
- Athelia ovata
- Athelia phycophila
- Athelia poeltii
- Athelia repetobasidiifera
- Athelia salicum
- Athelia sibirica
- Athelia singularis
- Athelia subovata
- Athelia tenuispora
- Athelia teutoburgensis
