= Clitocybula ellipsospora =

Scientific classification
- Kingdom: Fungi
- Division: Basidiomycota
- Class: Agaricomycetes
- Order: Agaricales
- Family: Porotheleaceae
- Genus: Clitocybula
- Species: C. ellipsospora

Binomial name
- Clitocybula ellipsospora Santamaria, N.; Rubio-Casas, L., & Zamora, J.C. (2022)

Fungus species

Clitocybula ellipsospora is a species of mushroom in the genus Clitocybula that was discovered in 2022. Currently it has only been identified in a few locations on the Iberian Peninsula.

== Description ==
Clitocybula ellipsospora Mycological characteristics
- Gills on hymenium
- Cap is convex
- Hymenium is adnate
- Stipe is bare
- Spore print is white
- Ecology is saprotrophic
- Edibility is unknown

It grows in small cespitose groups occasionally producing lone specimens. The cap is roughly 20–50 mm (0.79–1.97 in) with a plano-convex shape, with a depression in the centre, starts off circular but becomes irregular with age. The margin is curved not striated becoming very irregular and lacerated with maturity. Colour is uniformly silvery with beige and greyish-brown undertones in young and wet specimens. Stem is 25–65 mm (0.98–2.56 in) × 4–6 mm (0.16–0.24 in), central, curved, fistulous, very fibrous, wider at the junction with the cap and often flattened and/or cleft.

Basidiospores are ellipsoid to narrowly ellipsoid, hyaline, guttulate, distinctly amyloid, producing a white spore print.

== Habitat ==
Clitocybula ellipsospora grows in small clusters alongside partially buried deadwood, in Pinus sylvestris forests within the supra-mediterranean belt, on acid soils so far exclusively within the vicinity of peat bogs.
