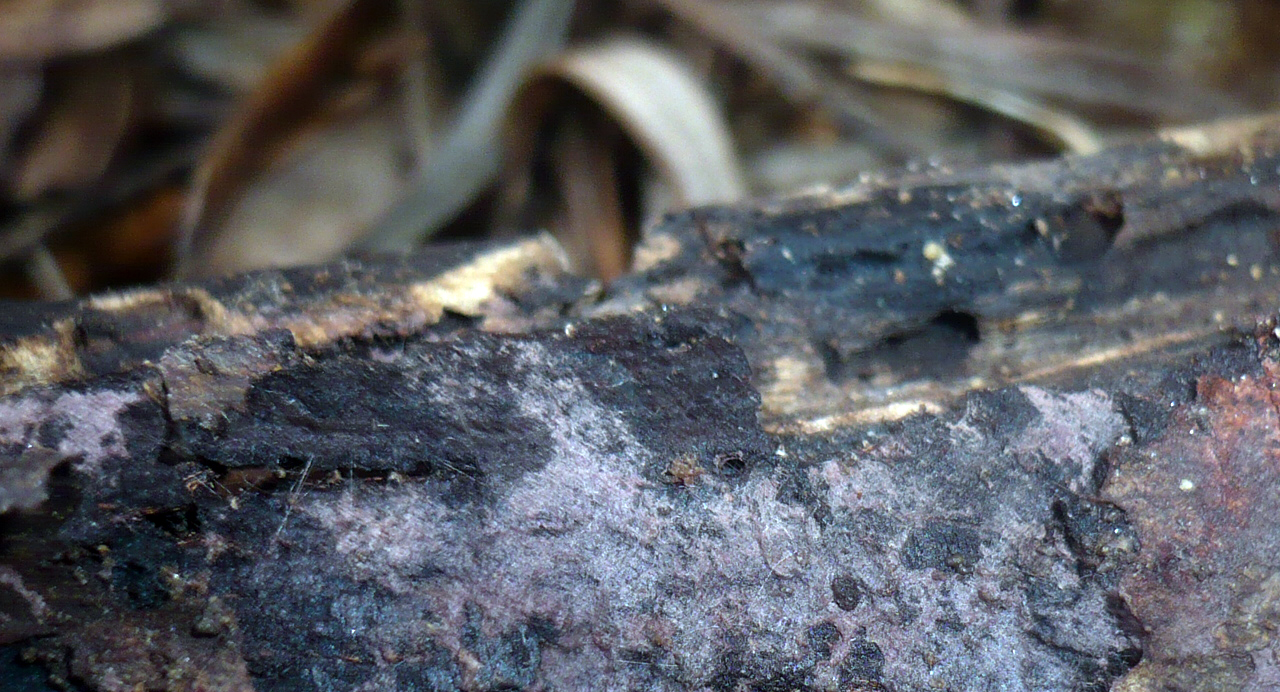
- Hypochnella violacea

Scientific classification
- Kingdom: Fungi
- Division: Basidiomycota
- Class: Agaricomycetes
- Order: Polyporales
- Genus: Hypochnella; J.Schröt. (1888)

Type species
- Hypochnella violacea Auersw. ex J.Schröt. (1888)

Species
- H. violacea H. verrucospora

Synonyms
- Hypochnus (Auersw. ex J.Schröt.) Sacc. (1888)

= Hypochnella =

Genus of fungi

Hypochnella is a genus of corticioid (crust-like) fungi. It is one of several genera that were doubtfully placed in the order Atheliaceae based on microscopic morphological simultaneous with core Atheliaceae genera. However, a molecular study with emphasis on Atheliales, including samples across most agaricomycete orders, retrivied the species Hypochnella violacea within the order Polyporales. Although a close relationship between Hypochnella violacea and genus Australohydnum was suggested, resolving the phylogenetic position of Hypochnella within Polyporales was outside the scope of the study. The genus contains two described species.

== Description ==
Members of Hypochnella form thin, membrane-like annual basidiocarps on various decaying biological substrates, notably heavily decayed wood. They can range in colour from greyish to various shades of purple or violet depending on i.a. humidity, and are resupinate to effuse in shape. The hymenal surface is hypochnoid and without sterile elements. The basidiosprores are pale brown and ellipsoid to amygdaliform (almond-shaped), or subsylindrical in Hypochnella verrucospora. They are distinctively thick-walled and amyloid compared to other corticoid fungi. Other types of spores are not known, and no anamorphs have been observed.

The hyphal system is monomitic, consisting of simple septate, smooth to partly encrusted generative hyphae without clamps, which branch at right to acute angles. Thickness of the hyphal walls, length of the cells and colour varies between different parts of the mycelium.

== Distribution ==
Both Hypochnella species are uncommon, and known from only a small number of sites. Their habitats and distribution differ substantially. H. violacea has been known for a significantly longer time than H. verrucospora and is found in several countries of temperate Europe as well as North America, while H. verrucospora is found only in Brazil and Argentina. Consequently, the former is assumed to have a temperate range while the latter is presumably restricted to the neotropics.
