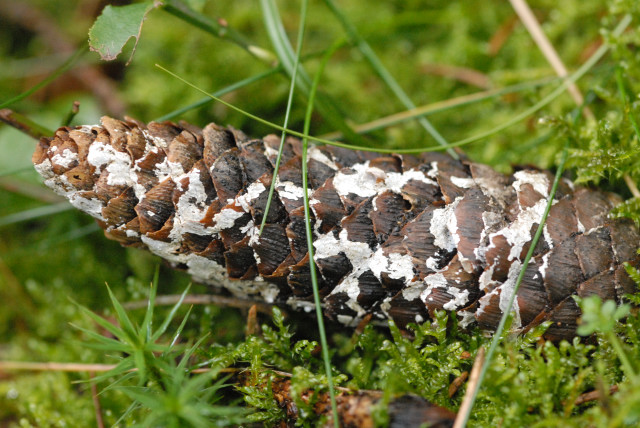
- Athelia bombacina

Scientific classification
- Kingdom: Fungi
- Division: Basidiomycota
- Class: Agaricomycetes
- Subclass: Agaricomycetidae
- Order: Atheliales
- Family: Atheliaceae; Jülich (1982)

Type genus
- Athelia Pers. (1822)

Genera
- 20, see text

= Atheliaceae =

Family of fungi

Atheliaceae is a family of mostly corticioid fungi placed in the order Atheliales. Both the order and the family were described by the Swiss mycologist Walter Jülich in 1981 along with three other families, Lobuliciaceae, Byssocorticiaceae, Pilodermataceae and Tylosporaceae discovered in 2020. According to a 2008 estimate, the family contains 20 genera and approximately 100 species. However, many genera formerly considered to belong in the Atheliaceae have since been moved to other families, including Amylocorticiaceae, Albatrellaceae, and Hygrophoraceae. Despite being a relatively small group with inconspicuous forms, Atheliaceae members show great diversity in life strategies and are widespread in distribution. Additionally, being a group strictly composed of largely corticioid fungi, they may also provide insights on the evolution of fruiting body forms in basidiomycetes.

== Taxonomy ==
Traditionally, the classification of basidiomycetes placed significant emphasis on readily observable features, such as the construction of the basidiocarp or the hymenophore. Initially, all members of the presently known Atheliaceae had been grouped together with the other corticioid basidiomycetes in an artificial group called Corticiaceae by Marinus Anton Donk in 1964. Following this, most currently known Atheliaceae species were once included in the broadly defined genus Athelia, which were then subsequently distributed over several genera by Walter Jülich in 1972 in his monograph of "Atheliae". In 1981, Jülich introduced the family Atheliaceae among other new families and orders, in an attempt to classify the higher order of basidiomycetes. Since then, several members of the family have been incorporated in a number of molecular phylogenetic studies. In a 2004 phylogenetic study based on molecular and morphological characters, representatives of Atheliaceae genera Piloderma, Athelia, Tylospora, Byssocorticium, Athelopsis, and Amphinema formed a monophyletic clade. Subsequently, the order Atheliales was found to be closely related to the Agaricales and Boletales, forming the monophyletic group known as the subclass Agaricomycetidae (class Agaricomycotina) in a 2007 study.

- Basidiomycota
  - Pucciniomycotina
  - Ustilaginomycotina
  - Agaricomycotina
    - Tremellomycetes
    - Dacrymycetes
    - Agaricomycetes
      - Auriculariales
      - Sebacinales
      - Cantharellales
      - Trechisporales
      - Phallomycetidae
        - Geastrales
        - Gomphales
        - Hysterangiales
        - Phallales
      - - Hymenochaetales
        - Corticiales
        - Gloeophyllales
        - - Polyporales
          - Thelephorales
        - Russulales
        - Agaricomycetidae
          - Agaricales
          - Atheliales
          - Boletales

The phylogeny of Basidiomycota based on Hibbett et al. (2007)

== Genera ==
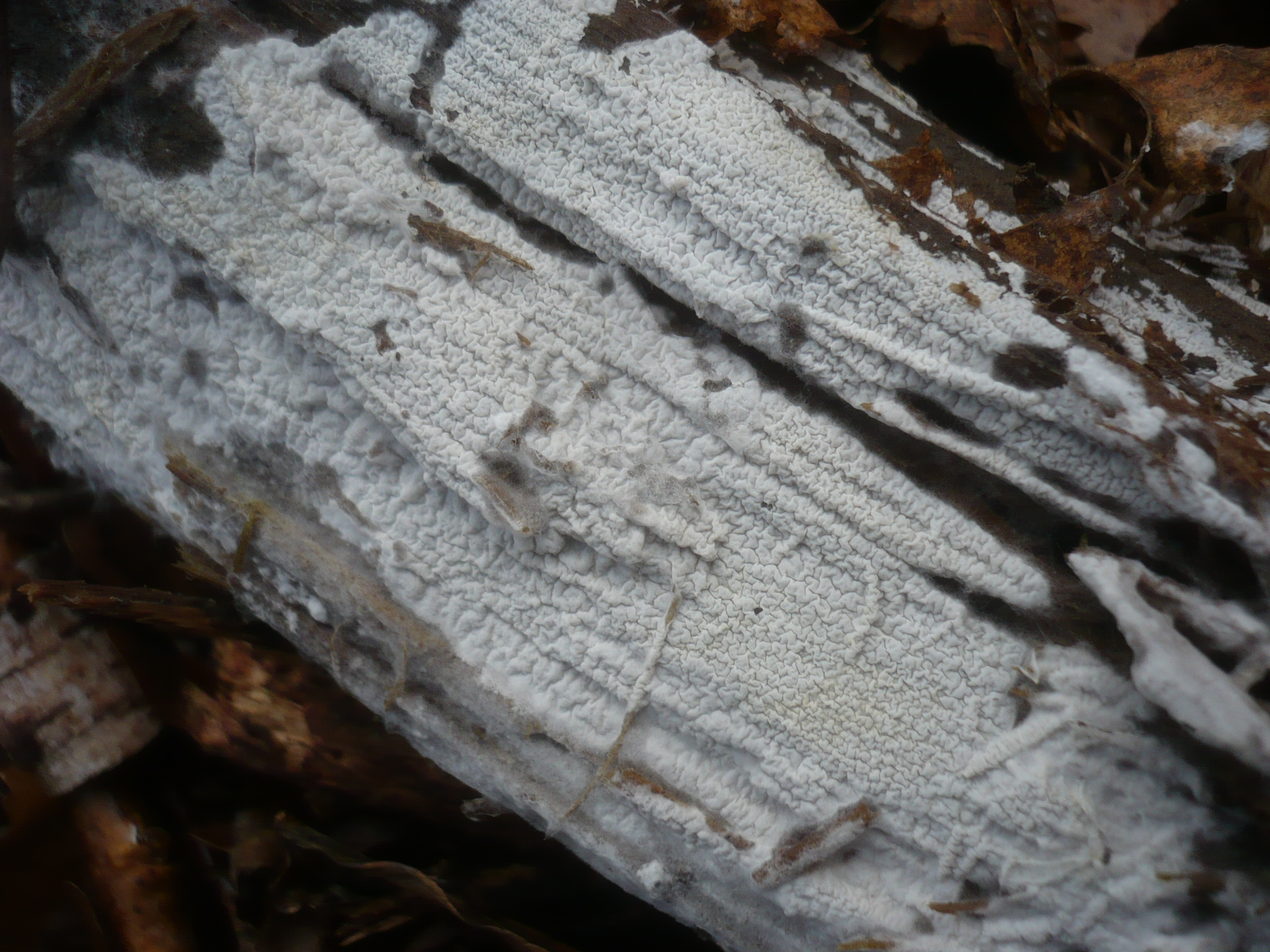
Athelia acrospora

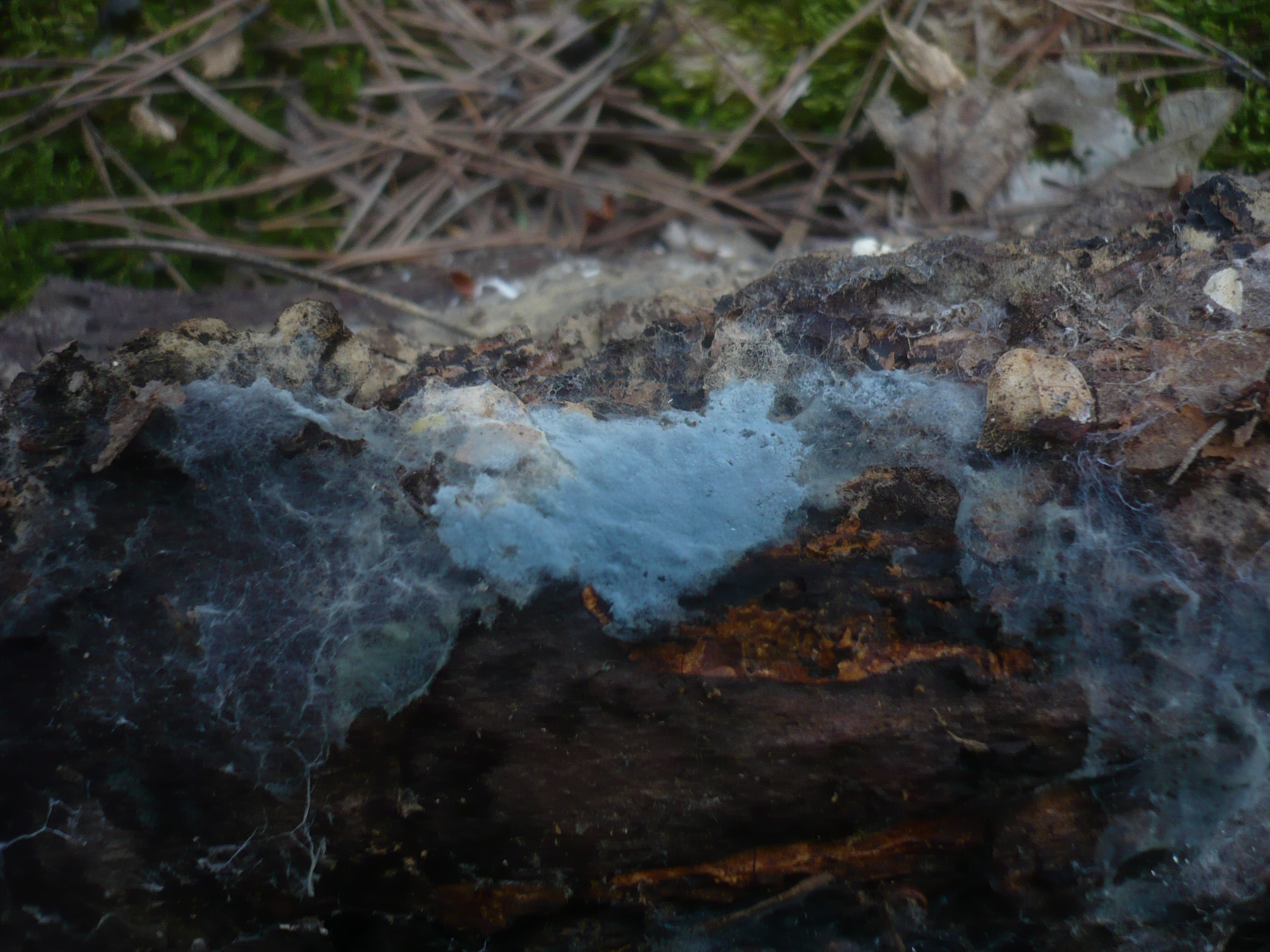
Byssocorticium atrovirens

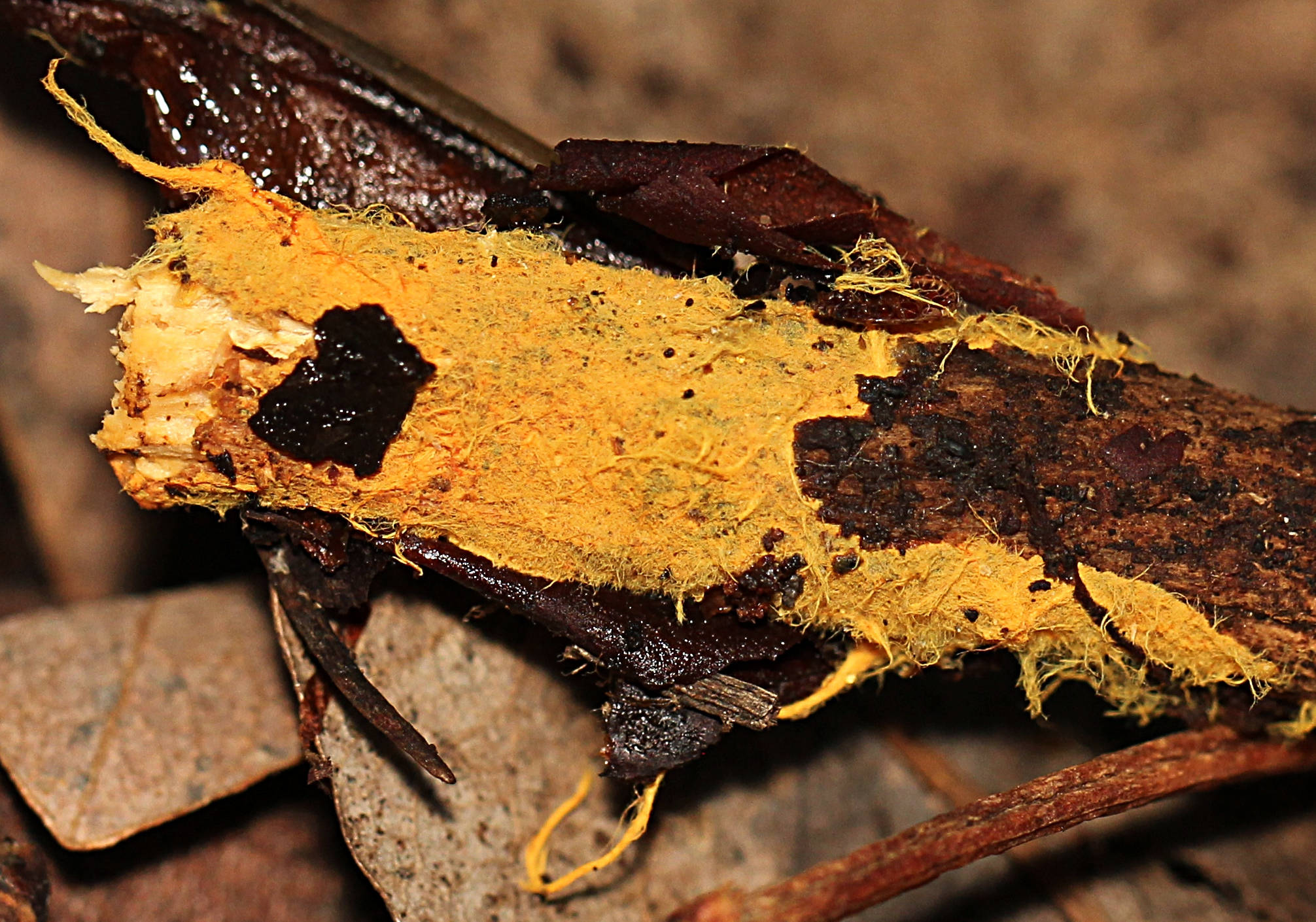
Piloderma fallax

List of genera and number of species based on the 10th edition of Ainsworth & Bisby's "Dictionary of the Fungi" (2008):

- Amphinema P.Karst. (1892) – 6 spp.
- Athelia Pers. (1822) (anamorph: Fibularhizoctonia) – 28 spp.
- Athelicium K.H.Larss. & Hjortstam (1986) – 2 spp.
- Athelocystis Hjortstam & Ryvarden (2010) – 1 sp.
- Butlerelfia Weresub & Illman (1980) – 1 sp.
- Byssocorticium Bondartsev & Singer (1944) – 9 spp.
- Byssoporia M.J.Larsen & Zak (1978) – 1 sp.
- Digitatispora Doguet (1962) – 2 spp.
- Elaphocephala Pouzar (1983) – 1 sp.
- Fibulomyces Jülich (1972) (anamorph: Taeniospora) – 4 spp.
- Hypochnella J.Schröt (1888) – 1 sp.
- Hypochniciellum Hjortstam & Ryvarden (1980) – 4 spp.
- Leptosporomyces Jülich (1972) – 11 spp.
- Lobulicium K.H. Larss. & Hjortstam (1982) – 1 sp.
- Lyoathelia Hjortstam & Ryvarden (2004) – 1 sp.
- Melzericium Hauerslev (1975) – 3 spp.
- Mycostigma Jülich (1976) – 1 sp.
- Piloderma Jülich (1969) – 6 spp.
- Pteridomyces Jülich (1979) – 7 spp.
- Tylospora Donk (1960) – 2 spp.

== Description ==
Atheliaceae consists of strictly corticioid fungi which resemble thin crusts with soft basidiocarps that are loosely attached to the substrate. Basidiocarps are thin with well-developed subiculum (wool- or crust-like growth of mycelium underneath the basidiocarp). The hymenal surface is smooth when dry, without any warts or papillae and may appear wrinkled when fresh. The colour is mostly whitish, sometimes greenish-bluish and rarely brownish. Their hyphal system is strictly monomitic, with transparent hyphae that have smooth surface or sometimes covered with granules or crystals. On the hypha, clamps may be present, rare, or absent. Cystidia are rarely observed in most species, and if observed are usually little differentiated. Mature basidia are club-shaped, arranged at typical clusters, bearing 2-6 sterigmata. Spores are non-amyloid with smooth surface and are normally spherical to ellipsoid, except in Tylospora where it is angular and warted.

== Distribution and ecology ==
Despite their morphological simplicity, members of Atheliaceae vary widely in terms of ecological strategies. A number of species are known to be saprotrophs of needle and leaf litter, while some species of Amphinema, Byssocorticium, Piloderma, and Tylospora are ectomycorrhizal symbionts. They sometimes constitute a major component of the mycorrhizal communities. Subsequently, parasitism has been observed in Athelia arachnoidea, which targets lichens. Lichen formation has been suggested to occur in Athelia epiphylla, which is also associated with the white rot of Populus tremuloides. A species of Athelia also engaged in a symbiotic relationship with termites of the genus Reticulitermes, in which the fungus forms sclerotia that mimic termite eggs and worker termites handling the sclerotia as if they were eggs. The presence of the sclerotia in the nest appears to enhance egg viability, while the fungus might be dispersed to new substrates.

Atheliaceae members are also quite widespread, with most of the discovered species occurring throughout the northern temperate regions. They are mostly found in moist environments, on substrates such as soil, humus, leaf litter, and wood. One species, Digitatispora marina, has been found to prefer salt water habitats, growing on marine-submerged woods.

== See also ==
- List of Basidiomycota families
