= Melzericium =

Scientific classification
- Kingdom: Fungi
- Division: Basidiomycota
- Class: Agaricomycetes
- Order: Atheliales
- Family: Atheliaceae
- Genus: Melzericium; Hauerslev (1975)

Type species
- Melzericium udicola (Bourdot) Hauerslev (1975)

Species
- M. bourdotii; M. rimosum; M. udicola

Genus of fungi

Melzericium is a genus of corticioid fungi in the family Atheliaceae. The widespread genus contains three species.
