= Cruciger =

Cruciger is a surname. Notable people with the surname include:

- Elisabeth Cruciger (c. 1500–1535), author of the early Protestant hymn "Herr Christ, der einig Gotts Sohn"
- Caspar Cruciger the Elder (1504–1548), German humanist
- Caspar Cruciger the Younger (1525–1597), German theologian

== See also ==
- Cruciger, a fungal genus
- Globus cruciger, an orb topped with a cross
- Polypedates cruciger, a species of frog
