= Hypolyssus natalis =

Scientific classification
- Domain: Eukaryota
- Kingdom: Fungi
- Division: Basidiomycota
- Class: Agaricomycetes
- Genus: Hypolyssus
- Species: H. natalis

Binomial name
- Hypolyssus natalis Rick (1959)

Species of fungus

Hypolyssus natalis is the single species of the Hypolyssus genus. It was documented in 1959 by Brazilian mycologist Johannes Rick. It was found on bark in Brazil.
