= Tylospora =

Scientific classification
- Kingdom: Fungi
- Division: Basidiomycota
- Class: Agaricomycetes
- Order: Atheliales
- Family: Atheliaceae
- Genus: Tylospora; Donk (1960)

Type species
- Tylospora asterophora (Bonord.) Donk (1960)

Species
- T. asterophora; T. fibrillosa

Synonyms
- Tylosperma Donk (1957)

Genus of fungi

Tylospora is a genus of fungi in the family Atheliaceae. The widespread genus contains two species.

Tylosporan fungi are identified by their lobed or triangular basidispores. They are found in acidic environments where they form mycorrhizal relationships with spruce trees, birch, and willows. Studies have found Tylosporan-type mycorrhizae to be the most abundant mycorrhizal type of spruce in Sweden, and in Central Europe.
