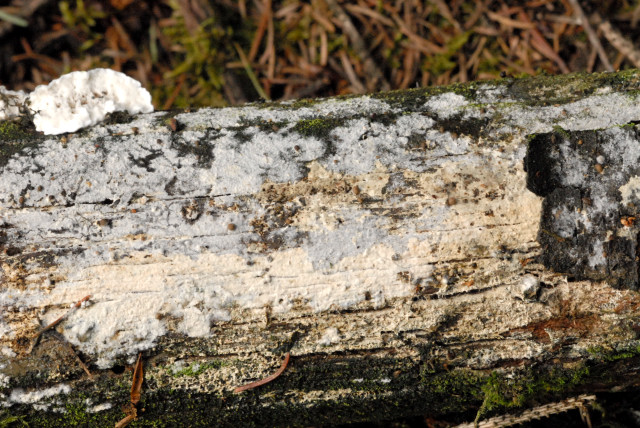

Scientific classification
- Kingdom: Fungi
- Division: Basidiomycota
- Class: Agaricomycetes
- Genus: Resinicium
- Species: R. bicolor

Binomial name
- Resinicium bicolor (Alb. & Schwein.) Parmasto (1968)

Synonyms
- Acia bicolor (Alb. & Schwein.) P.Karst. (1880); Acia subtilis (Fr.) P.Karst. (1880); Grandinia mucida sensu Rea (1922); Hydnum bicolor Alb. & Schwein. (1805); Hydnum ochroleucum var. subtile (Fr.) Pers. (1825); Hydnum subtile Fr. (1821); Kneiffia subgelatinosa Berk. & Broome (1875); Mycoacia bicolor (Alb. & Schwein.) Spirin & Zmitr. (2004); Odontia bicolor (Alb. & Schwein.) Fr. (1903); Odontia bicolor (Alb. & Schwein.) Quél. (1886); Odontia subtilis (Fr.) Quél. (1888)

= Resinicium bicolor =

Species of fungus

Resinicium bicolor is a fungal plant pathogen infecting Douglas firs.

R. bicolor was identified as the main component of the fungal community of 'rice-like' tubers of Gastrodia elata.
