= Tylosperma =

Tylosperma may refer to two different genera:

- Tylosperma Botsch., a taxonomic synonym for the plant genus Potentilla
- Tylosperma Donk (1957), a taxonomic synonym for the fungus genus Tylospora
