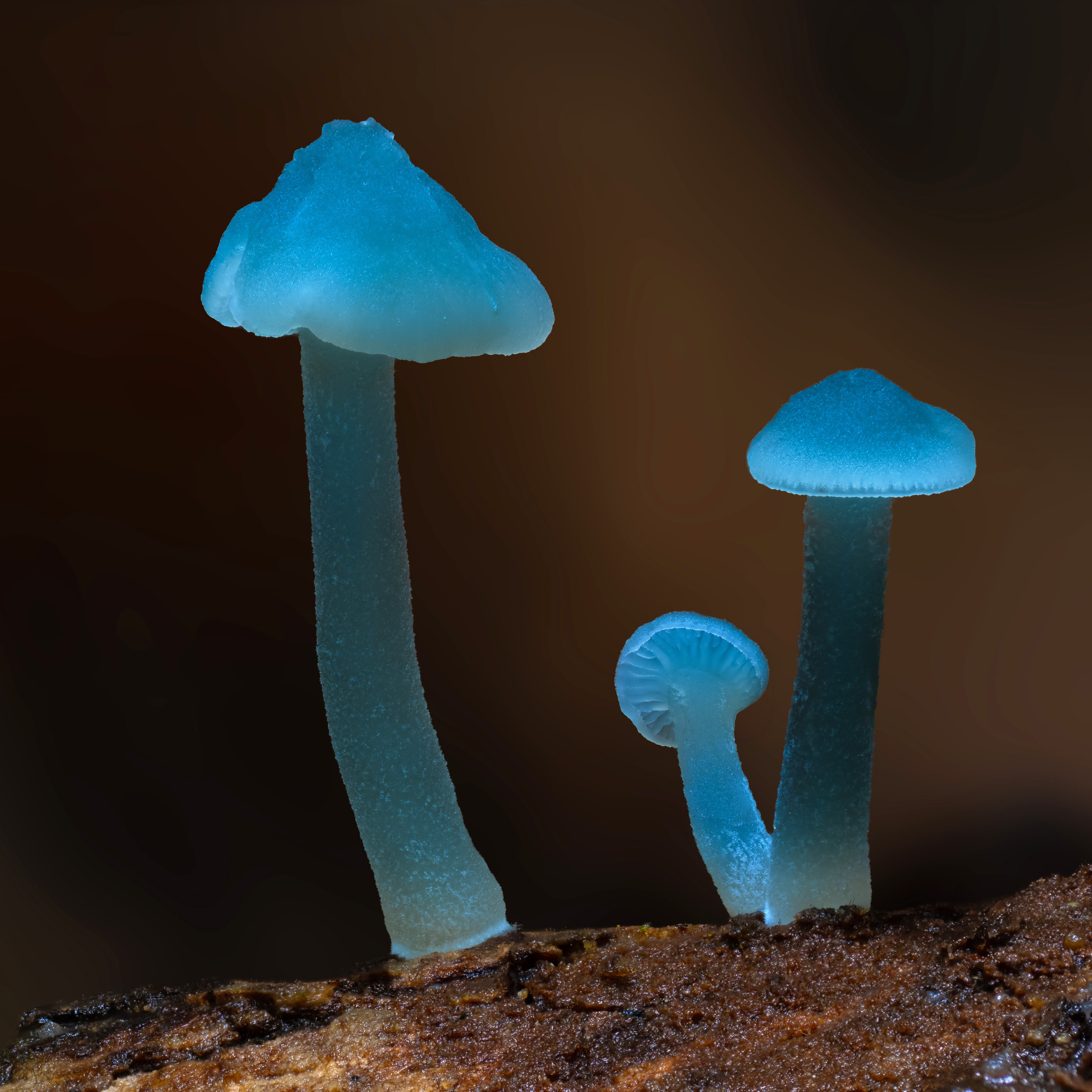

Scientific classification
- Kingdom: Fungi
- Division: Basidiomycota
- Class: Agaricomycetes
- Order: Agaricales
- Family: Porotheleaceae
- Genus: Clitocybula
- Species: C. azurea

Binomial name
- Clitocybula azurea Singer

= Clitocybula azurea =

Species of mushroom native to Central and South America

Clitocybula azurea is a species of mushroom in the genus Clitocybula. It is native to Central and South America.

Clitocybula azurea has subglobose to broadly ellipsoid, smooth, inequilateral, amyloid spores which measure 4–6.5 × 3–5 μm. The cheilocystidia and pleurocystidia measure 18–30 × 3.5–8 μm and are versiform, cylindrical, clavate or utriform, subcapitate or with an apical papilla. Phylogenetically Clitocybula azurea is in Clitocybula sensu stricto, and is a sister species to Clitocybula familia.

== Gallery ==
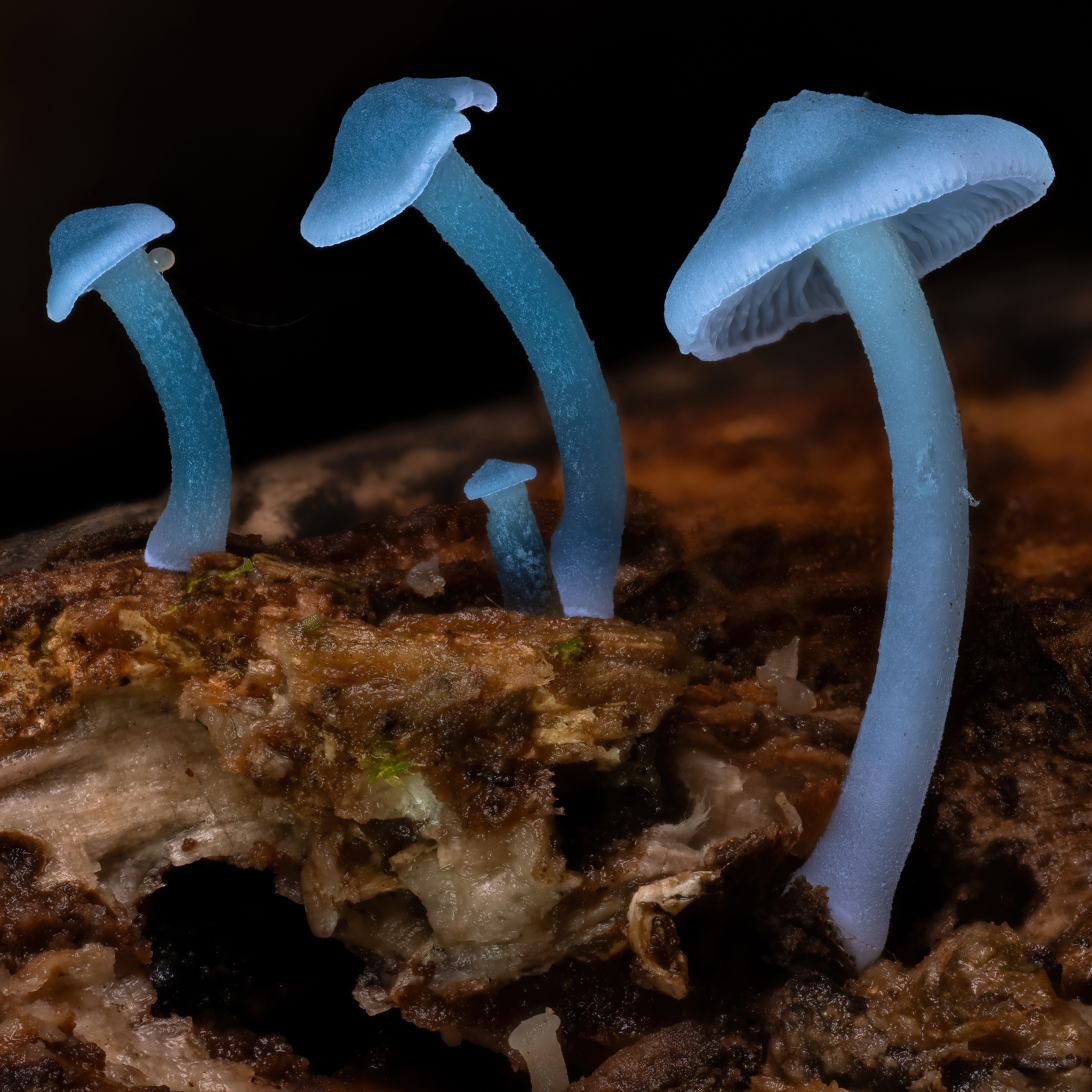
Clitocybula azurea closeup

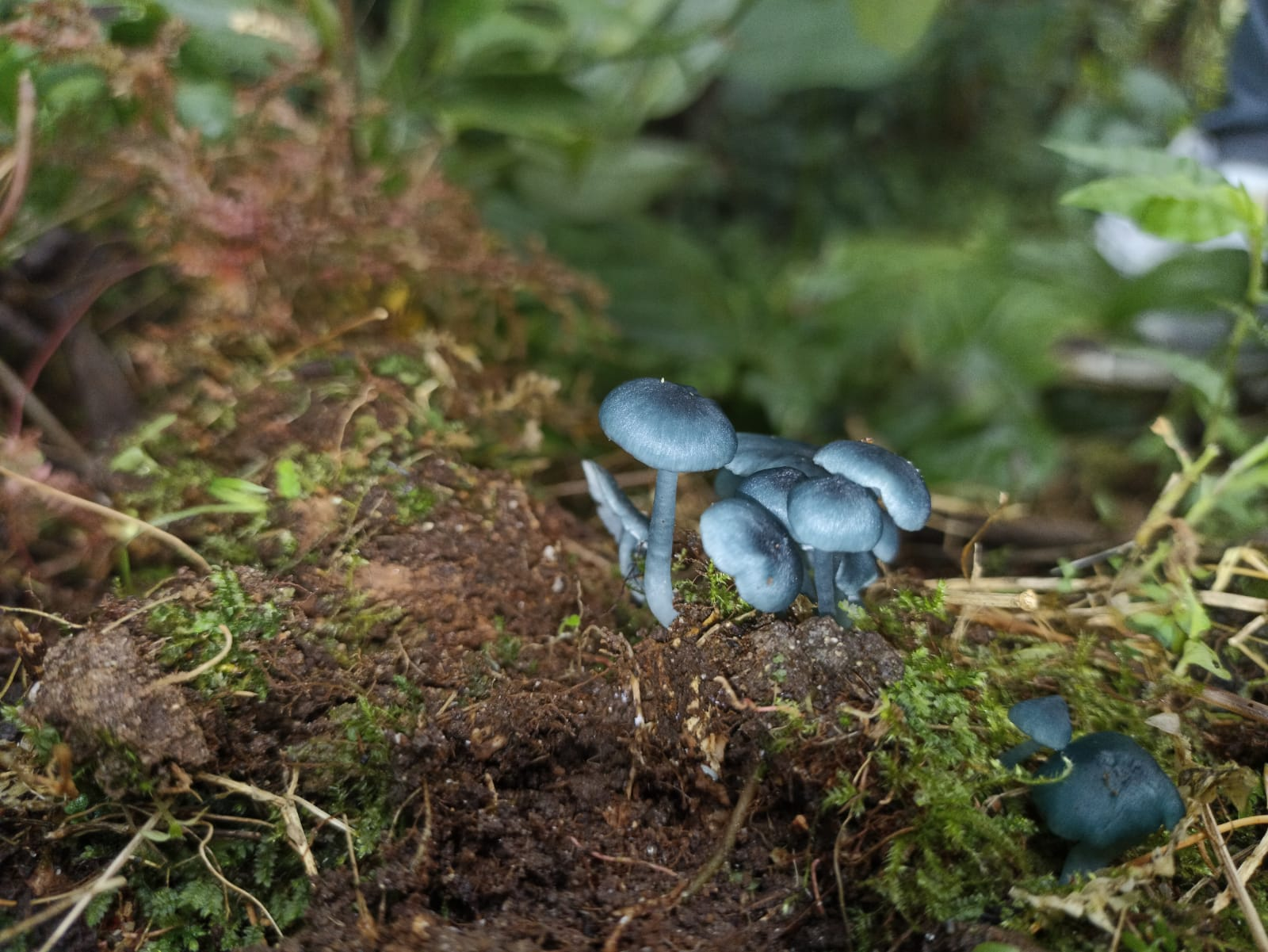
Clitocybula azurea

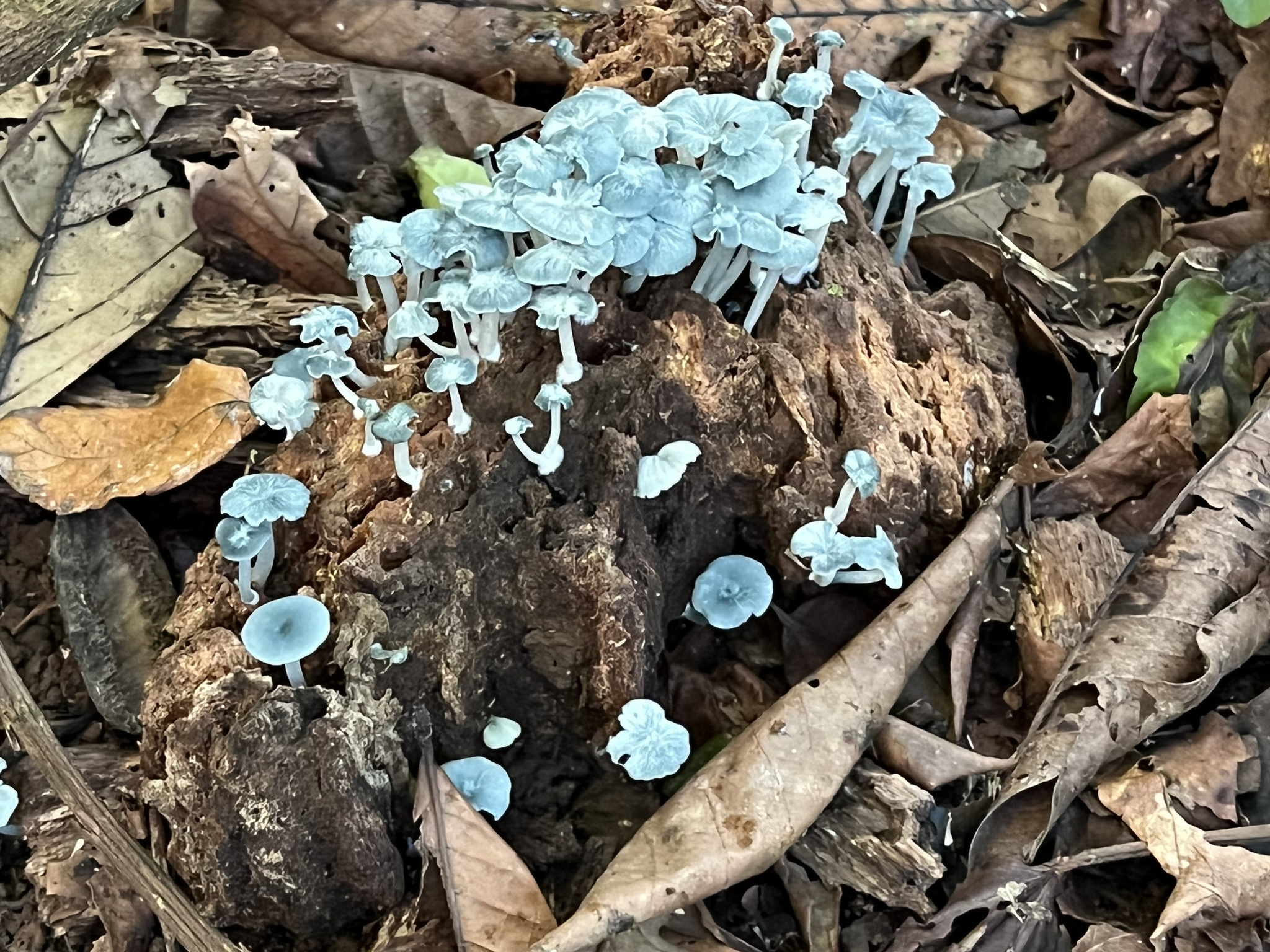
Clitocybula azurea
