= Phlyctibasidium =

Scientific classification
- Kingdom: Fungi
- Division: Basidiomycota
- Class: Agaricomycetes
- Subclass: incertae sedis
- Genus: Phlyctibasidium; Jülich (1974)

Type species
- Phlyctibasidium polyporoideum (Berk. & M.A.Curtis) Jülich (1974)

Genus of fungi

Phlyctibasidium is a fungal genus of uncertain taxonomic placement in the Agaricomycetes. This is a monotypic genus, containing the single corticioid species Phlyctibasidium polyporoideum.
