= Trechinothus =

Scientific classification
- Domain: Eukaryota
- Kingdom: Fungi
- Division: Basidiomycota
- Class: Agaricomycetes
- Subclass: incertae sedis
- Genus: Trechinothus; E.C.Martini & Trichies, 2004

Species
- Trechinothus smardae

Genus of fungi

Trechinothus is a genus of fungus with unknown status.

The genus was described in 2004 by E.C.Martini and Trichies.

The species of this genus are found in Europe.

Species:

- Trechinothus smardae (Pilát) E.C.Martini & Trichies, 2004
