= Jaapia =

Scientific classification
- Domain: Eukaryota
- Kingdom: Fungi
- Division: Basidiomycota
- Class: Agaricomycetes
- Order: Jaapiales; Manfr.Binder, K.H.Larss. & Hibbett (2010)
- Family: Jaapiaceae; Manfr.Binder, K.H.Larss. & Hibbett (2010)
- Genus: Jaapia; Bres.

Type species
- Jaapia argillacea Bres. (1911)

Species
- Jaapia argillacea Jaapia ochroleuca

Genus of fungi

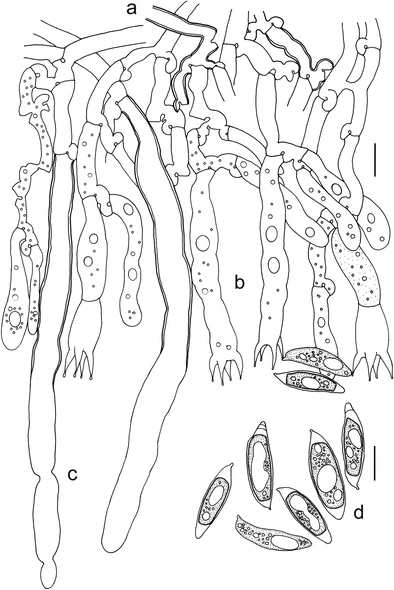
Jaapia argillacea

Jaapia is a genus in the monotypic family Jaapiaceae and order Jaapiales. The genus was first described by Italian mycologist Giacomo Bresadola in 1911, and contains two widely distributed species, J. argillacea and J. ochroleuca. The order was described in 2010.

The genus name of Jaapia is in honour of Otto Jaap (1864 - 1922), who was a German botanist (Mycology, Lichenology and Bryology).

Jaapia is a genus of resupinate species that were until then classified in the order Boletales. Molecular phylogenetics analysis showed it to be a sister group (one of two clades to the Gloeophyllales, resulting from the splitting of a single lineage) to the rest of the Agaricomycetidae.

Sexual states occur on rotting, water-saturated wood and are filmy, patchy basidiocarps with cylindrical cystidia intermixed with basidia with four long sterigmata and narrowly fusoid basidiospores. No asexual states are reported. Mostly reported from Europe, they are temperate to polar and widespread. ITS DNA barcoding discriminates both species, with several haplotypes documented within each.

The genome of Jaapia argillacea lacks lignin-degrading peroxidases typical of white rot fungi, but has fifteen genes coding for lytic polysaccharide monooxygenases; experiments demonstrate localized erosion of all wood cell wall layers, similar to other white rots.
