= Hypolyssus =

Scientific classification
- Domain: Eukaryota
- Kingdom: Fungi
- Division: Basidiomycota
- Class: Agaricomycetes
- Genus: Hypolyssus; Pers. (1825)

Type species
- Hypolyssus undulatus Pers. (1825)

Species
- H. natalis

Genus of fungi

Hypolyssus is a genus of fungi belonging to the Agaricomycetes class; it has not been assigned to an order or a family. It consists of one species: Hypolyssus natalis. It was documented in 1825 by German mycologist Christiaan Hendrik Persoon.
