= Melzer's reagent =

Stain for fungus parts to identify them

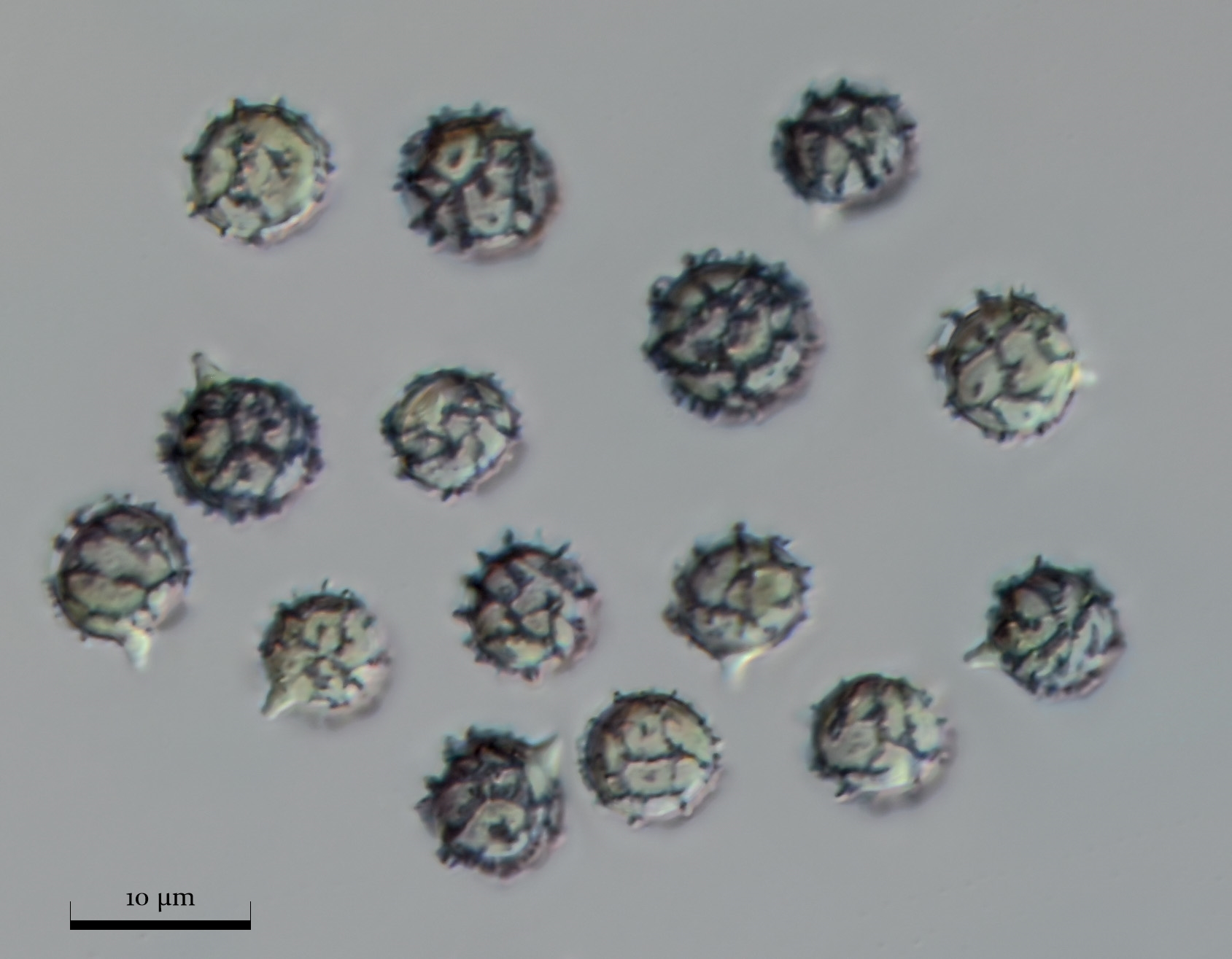
Lactarius rubidus spores stained with Melzer's reagent

Melzer's reagent (also known as Melzer's iodine reagent, Melzer's solution or informally as Melzer's) is an iodine-based chemical reagent consisting of potassium iodide and elemental iodine (IKI) in a solution of chloral hydrate and water, used by mycologists to assist with the microscopic identification of fungi, and by phytopathologists for fungal plant pathogens. It was first described in 1924 by the Czech mycologist Václav Melzer, who used it to highlight the ornamentation on the surface of basidiospores from the mushroom genus Russula, a feature that is taxonomically important in that group and strongly enhanced by mounting in Melzer's reagent.

== History ==
The use of iodine-containing solutions as an aid to describing and identifying fungi dates back to the mid-19th century. Melzer's reagent was first described in 1924 and takes its name from its inventor, the mycologist Václav Melzer, who modified an older chloral hydrate-containing IKI solution developed by botanist Arthur Meyer. Melzer was a specialist in Russula, a genus in which the amyloidy on the spore ornamentation or entire spore is of great taxonomic significance. In Melzer and Jaroslav Zvára's 1927 Russula monograph, they refer to the solution as "jodkalichloral" (potassium iodide-chloral). Other mycologists, in particular Robert Kühner, soon experimented with the compound to test reactions in a wide variety of microanatomical structures in the asco- and basidiomycetes, and the formulation, eventually known as "Melzer's reagent", became a standard diagnostic agent in mycological microscopy.

== Composition ==
Melzer's reagent is an aqueous solution of chloral hydrate, potassium iodide, and iodine. Václav Melzer's original formulation was given as a solution of 20 g water, 1.5 g potassium iodide, and 0.5 g iodine, with a portion of this mixture combined as needed in a 1:1 ratio with chloral hydrate. This formula would yield a mixture of 50% chloral hydrate, 45.5% water, 3.4% potassium iodide, and 1.1% iodine. Although all formulas for Melzer's reagent use the same four compounds, subsequent authors have often considerably altered the proportions of iodine and potassium iodide found in the reagent. Depending on the formulation, modern versions range from approximately 2.4-3.6% potassium iodide and 0.73–1.2% iodine (the ratio of potassium iodide to iodine typically ranges from 2:1 to 3.3:1), with the remainder of the solution being about 50% chloral hydrate and 50% water.

Melzer's is hazardous if ingested due to the presence of iodine and chloral hydrate. Due to the legal status of chloral hydrate, Melzer's reagent is difficult to obtain in the United States.

== Related reagents ==
Melzer's reagent is part of a class of iodine/potassium iodide (IKI)-containing reagents used in biology. Lugol's iodine is another such formula. A stronger concentration solution of Lugol's iodine sometimes used in mycology is termed Baral's iodine. Schultze's reagent, which is used in botanical microscopy, is an IKI mixture in a zinc chloride and water solution. Václav Melzer himself describes using a zinc chloride-iodine solution to highlight the basidiospore ornamentation in Russula, before abandoning it in favor of his newly-formulated reagent, which he notes yielded a stronger reaction.

Chloral hydrate-iodine solutions have been used in botany since the 1820s to examine starch granules in chloroplasts and other structures, and were still occasionally used in botanical microscopy into the 20th century. In phycology, the von Stosch staining protocol, developed by Hans-Adolf von Stosch, is a common technique for staining the theca of dinoflagellates using a chloral hydrate-hydroiodic acid-iodine solution.

In response to difficulties obtaining chloral hydrate, scientists at Rutgers formulated a proprietary compound called Visikol as a replacement for chloral hydrate in formulations for microscopy. A 2019 paper described an experiment demonstrating that Visikol/IKI behaves differently to Melzer’s reagent in several key situations, noting it should not be recommended as a viable substitute.

== Reactions ==
Melzer's is used by exposing fungal tissue or cells to the reagent, typically in a microscope slide preparation, and looking for any of three color reactions:

- Amyloid or Melzer's-positive reaction, in which the material reacts blue to black.
- Pseudoamyloid or dextrinoid reaction, in which the material reacts brown to reddish brown.
- Inamyloid or Melzer's-negative, in which the tissues do not change color, or react faintly yellow-brown.

Among the amyloid reaction, two types can be distinguished:

- Euamyloid reaction, in which the material turns blue without potassium hydroxide (KOH)-pretreatment.
- Hemiamyloid reaction, in which the material turns red in Lugol's solution, but shows no reaction in Melzer's reagent; when KOH-pretreated it turns blue in both reagents (hemiamyloidity).

Melzer's reactions are typically almost immediate, though in some cases the reaction may take up to 20 minutes to develop.

The function of the chemicals that make up Melzer's reagent are several. The chloral hydrate is a clearing agent, bleaching and improving the transparency of various dark-colored microscopic materials. The potassium iodide is used to improve the solubility of the iodine, which is otherwise only semi-soluble in water. Iodine is thought to be the main active staining agent in Melzer's; it is thought to react with starch-like polysaccharides in the cell walls of amyloid material, however, its mechanism of action is not entirely understood. It has been observed that hemiamyloid material reacts differently when exposed to Melzer's than it does when exposed to other IKI solutions such as Lugol's, and that in some cases an amyloid reaction is shown in material that had prior exposure to KOH, but an inamyloid reaction without such pretreatment.

An experiment in which spores from 35 species of basidiomycetes were tested for reactions to both Melzer's and Lugol's showed that spores in a large percentage of the species tested display very different reactions between the two reagents. These varied from being weakly or non-reactive in Lugols, to giving iodine-positive reactions in Lugol's but not in Melzer's, to even giving dextrinoid reactions in Lugol's while giving amyloid reactions in Melzer's.

Melzer's degrades into a cloudy precipitate when combined with alkaline solutions, hence it cannot be used in combination or in direct series with such common mycological reagents such as potassium hydroxide or ammonium hydroxide solutions. When potassium hydroxide is used as a pretreatment, the alkalinity must be first neutralized before adding Melzer's.
