= Akenomyces =

Scientific classification
- Kingdom: Fungi
- Division: Basidiomycota
- Class: Agaricomycetes
- Subclass: incertae sedis
- Genus: Akenomyces; G.Arnaud ex D.Hornby (1984)

Type species
- Akenomyces costatus D.Hornby (1984)

Synonyms
- Akenomyces G.Arnaud (1954)

Genus of fungi

Akenomyces is a fungal genus in the class Agaricomycetes. It has not yet been placed in any order or family. A monotypic genus, it contains the single anamorphic species Akenomyces costatus. The generic name is derived from the Latin achene, "small dry fruit".
