= Ceraceopsis =

Scientific classification
- Kingdom: Fungi
- Division: Basidiomycota
- Class: Agaricomycetes
- Subclass: incertae sedis
- Genus: Ceraceopsis; Hjortstam & Ryvarden (2007)

Type species
- Ceraceopsis verruculosa Hjortstam & Ryvarden (2007)

Genus of fungi

Ceraceopsis is a fungal genus in the class Agaricomycetes. It has not yet been placed in any order or family. A monotypic genus, it contains the single corticioid species Ceraceopsis verruculosa, found growing on dead deciduous wood in Venezuela. The type collection was made in June 1997, in Yutajé (Amazonas State). Ceraceopsis was circumscribed by mycologists Kurt Hjortstam and Leif Ryvarden in 2007.
