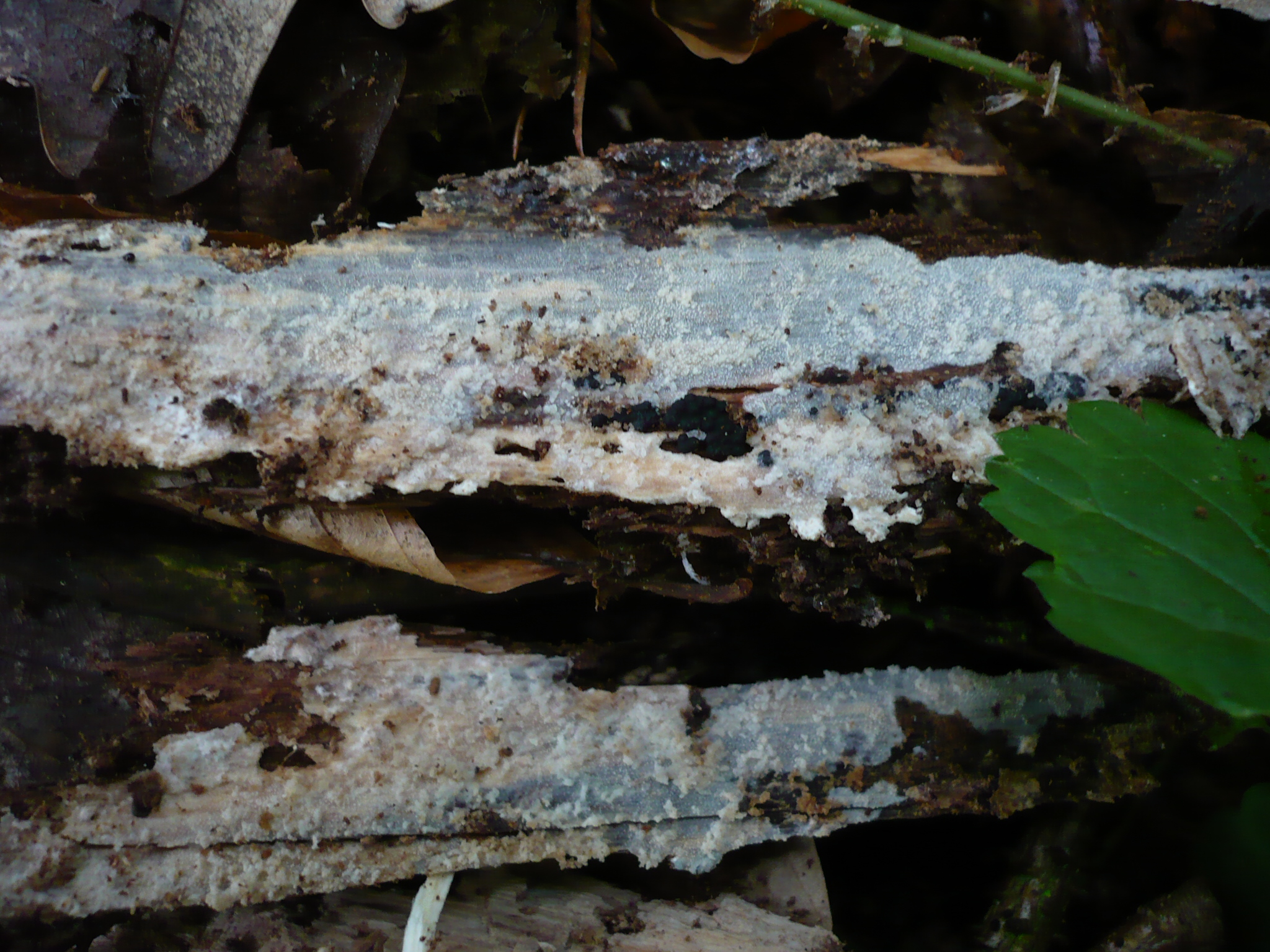
- Resinicium bicolor

Scientific classification
- Kingdom: Fungi
- Division: Basidiomycota
- Class: Agaricomycetes
- Subclass: incertae sedis
- Genus: Resinicium; Parmasto (1968)

Type species
- Resinicium bicolor (Alb. & Schwein.) Parmasto (1968)

= Resinicium =

Genus of fungi

Resinicium is a genus of crust fungi of uncertain placement in the class Agaricomycetes. The genus was circumscribed by Estonian mycologist Erast Parmasto in 1968.

== Species ==
- Resinicium aculeatum Tellería, Melo & Dueñas (2008)
- Resinicium bicolor (Alb. & Schwein.) Parmasto (1968)
- Resinicium chiricahuaense Gilb. & Budington (1970)
- Resinicium confertum Nakasone (2007)
- Resinicium friabile Hjortstam & Melo (1997)
- Resinicium furfuraceum (Bres.) Parmasto (1968)
- Resinicium granulare (Burt) Sheng H.Wu (1990)
- Resinicium luteosulphureum (Rick) Baltazar & Rajchenb. (2016)
- Resinicium luteum Jülich (1978)
- Resinicium monticola Nakasone (2007)
- Resinicium mutabile Nakasone (2007)
- Resinicium pinicola (J.Erikss.) J.Erikss. & Hjortstam (1981)
- Resinicium praeteritum (H.S.Jacks. & Dearden) Ginns & M.N.L.Lefebvre (1993)
- Resinicium rimulosum Nakasone (2007)
- Resinicium saccharicola (Burt) Nakasone (2000)
- Resinicium tenue Nakasone (2007)
