= Skvortzovia =

Scientific classification
- Kingdom: Fungi
- Division: Basidiomycota
- Class: Agaricomycetes
- Subclass: incertae sedis
- Genus: Skvortzovia; Bononi & Hjortstam (1987)

Type species
- Skvortzovia furfurella (Bres.) Bononi & Hjortstam (1987)

Synonyms
- Odontia furfurella Bres. (1925); Resinicium furfurellum (Bres.) Nakasone (1990); Jacksonomyces furfurellus (Bres.) Sheng H.Wu & Z.C.Chen (1992); Mycoacia furfurella (Bres.) Spirin & Zmitr. (2004); Odontia verrukawa H.Furuk. (1974)

Genus of fungi

Skvortzovia is a fungal genus of unknown placement in the class Agaricomycetes. It is a monotypic genus, containing the single species Skvortzovia furfurella, found in the United States. This crust fungus was originally described by Italian mycologist Giacomo Bresadola in 1925 as Odontia furfurella. Vera Lúcia Bononi and Kurt Hjortstam circumscribed Skvortzovia in Mycotaxon vol.28 on page 12 in 1987 to contain the species.

The genus name honours botanist Boris Skvortzov (1896–1980), who was a Polish-Russian-Brazilian botanist (Algology and Mycology) and collected crust fungi extensively in Brazil.
