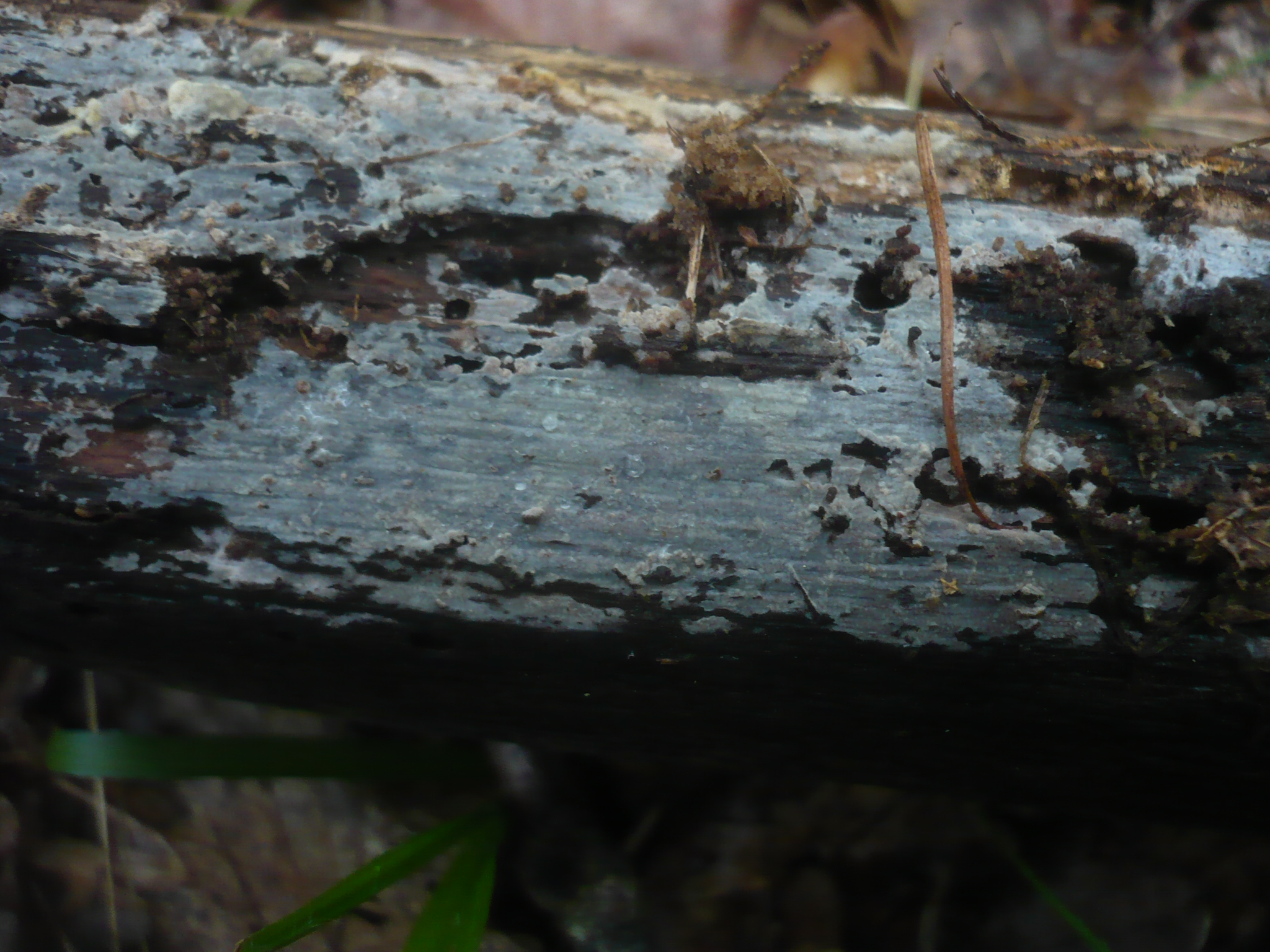
- Peniophorella pubera

Scientific classification
- Kingdom: Fungi
- Division: Basidiomycota
- Class: Agaricomycetes
- Subclass: incertae sedis
- Genus: Peniophorella; P.Karst. (1889)

Type species
- Peniophorella pubera Fr. (1828)

Species
- P. allantospora; P. baculorubrensis; P. calcitrapa; P. capitulata; P. calvigera; P. compta; P. comptopsis; P. cylindrocystidiata; P. echinocystis; P. flagellata; P. guttulifera; P. incrustatissima; P. martinii; P. microtsugae; P. neopubera; P. odontiiformis; P. pallida; P. pertenuis; P. praetermissa; P. pubera; P. rude; P. subglobospora; P. subpraetermissa; P. tessulata; P. torquata; P. tsugae; P. viperiformis

= Peniophorella =

Genus of fungi

Peniophorella is a genus of fungus belonging to the Agaricomycetes class; it has not been assigned to an order or a family. It contains 27 species. The genus was documented in 1889 by Finnish mycologist Petter Adolf Karsten.
