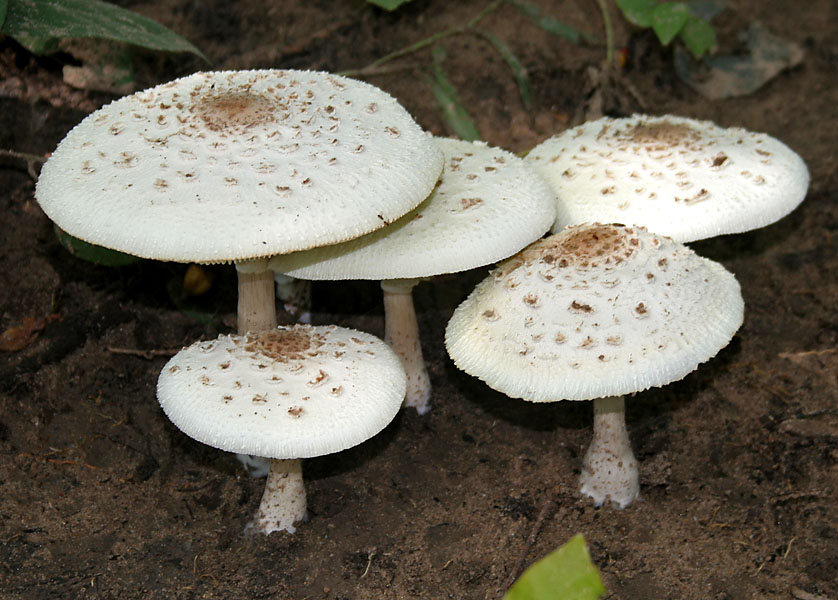
- Chlorophyllum brunneum (Agaricales)

Scientific classification
- Kingdom: Fungi
- Division: Basidiomycota
- Class: Agaricomycetes
- Subclass: Agaricomycetidae; Parmasto (1986)

Orders
- Agaricales; Amylocorticiales; Atheliales; Boletales; Lepidostromatales

= Agaricomycetidae =

Agaricomycetidae Temporal range: Upper Aptian–Holocene, 113–0 Ma

Subclass of fungi

Agaricomycetidae is a subclass of fungi, in the division Basidiomycota. The name Agaricomycetidae had previously been named by Marcel Locquin in 1984, but his publication did not contain a Latin diagnosis and it is therefore invalid under the International Code of Nomenclature for algae, fungi, and plants. It was subsequently validly published by Erast Parmasto in 1986.
