= Heřmanova Huť =

- Municipality
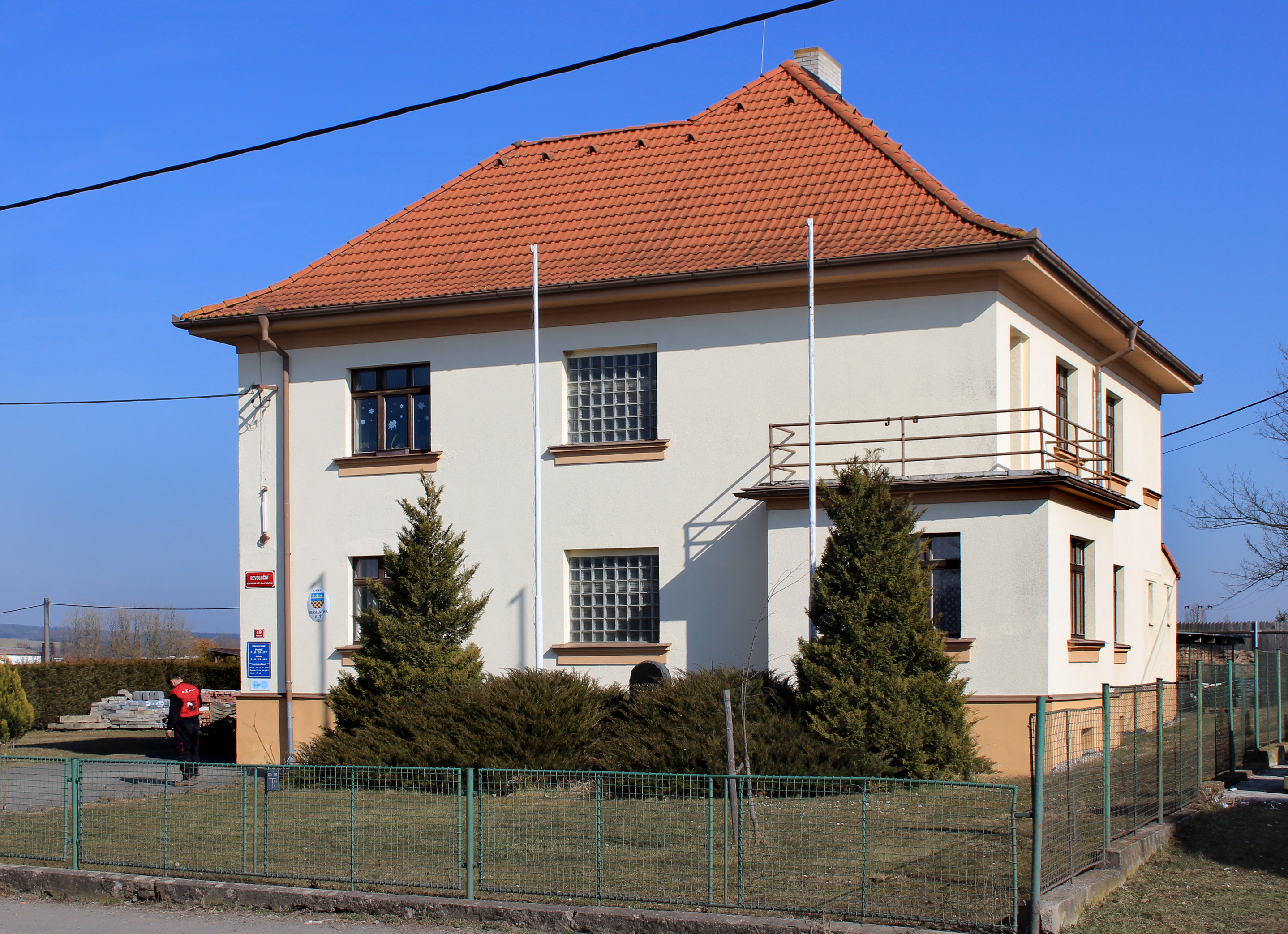
- Municipal office

- Flag Coat of arms

- Location in the Czech Republic
- Coordinates: 49°42′43″N 13°5′15″E
- Country: Czech Republic
- Region: Plzeň
- District: Plzeň-North
- Established: 1954

Area
  - Total: 9.88 km^{2} (3.81 sq mi)
- Elevation: 380 m (1,250 ft)

Population (2026-01-01)
  - Total: 1,949
  - Density: 197/km^{2} (511/sq mi)
- Time zone: UTC+1 (CET)
  - Summer (DST): UTC+2 (CEST)
- Postal code: 330 24
- Website: www.hermanovahut.cz

Heřmanova Huť is a municipality in Plzeň-North District in the Plzeň Region of the Czech Republic. It has about 1,900 inhabitants.

== Administrative division ==
Heřmanova Huť consists of four municipal parts (in brackets population according to the 2021 census):

- Dolní Sekyřany (261)
- Horní Sekyřany (177)
- Vlkýš (993)
- Vlkýš I (294)

== Etymology ==
The name literally means 'Heřman's smelter' in Czech.

== Geography ==
Heřmanova Huť is located about 19 kilometres (12 mi) west of Plzeň. It lies in the Plasy Uplands. The highest point is at 487 m (1,598 ft) above sea level.

== History ==
The first written mention of Sekyřany is from 1115. The village was later split to Dolní ('lower') Sekyřany and Horní ('upper') Sekyřany. Both villages were bought by the Chotěšov Abbey in 1253. The first written mention of Vlkýš is from 1457.

The municipality of Heřmanova Huť was founded in 1954 through the merger of three municipalities: Vlkýš, Dolní Sekyřany and Horní Sekyřany.

== Demographics ==
Historical population

| Year | Pop. | ±% |
|---|---|---|
| 1869 | 3,134 | — |
| 1880 | 4,174 | +33.2% |
| 1890 | 3,701 | −11.3% |
| 1900 | 3,081 | −16.8% |
| 1910 | 2,824 | −8.3% |

| Year | Pop. | ±% |
|---|---|---|
| 1921 | 2,755 | −2.4% |
| 1930 | 2,638 | −4.2% |
| 1950 | 1,744 | −33.9% |
| 1961 | 1,803 | +3.4% |
| 1970 | 1,810 | +0.4% |

| Year | Pop. | ±% |
|---|---|---|
| 1980 | 1,860 | +2.8% |
| 1991 | 1,745 | −6.2% |
| 2001 | 1,755 | +0.6% |
| 2011 | 1,762 | +0.4% |
| 2021 | 1,725 | −2.1% |

Source: Censuses

== Transport ==
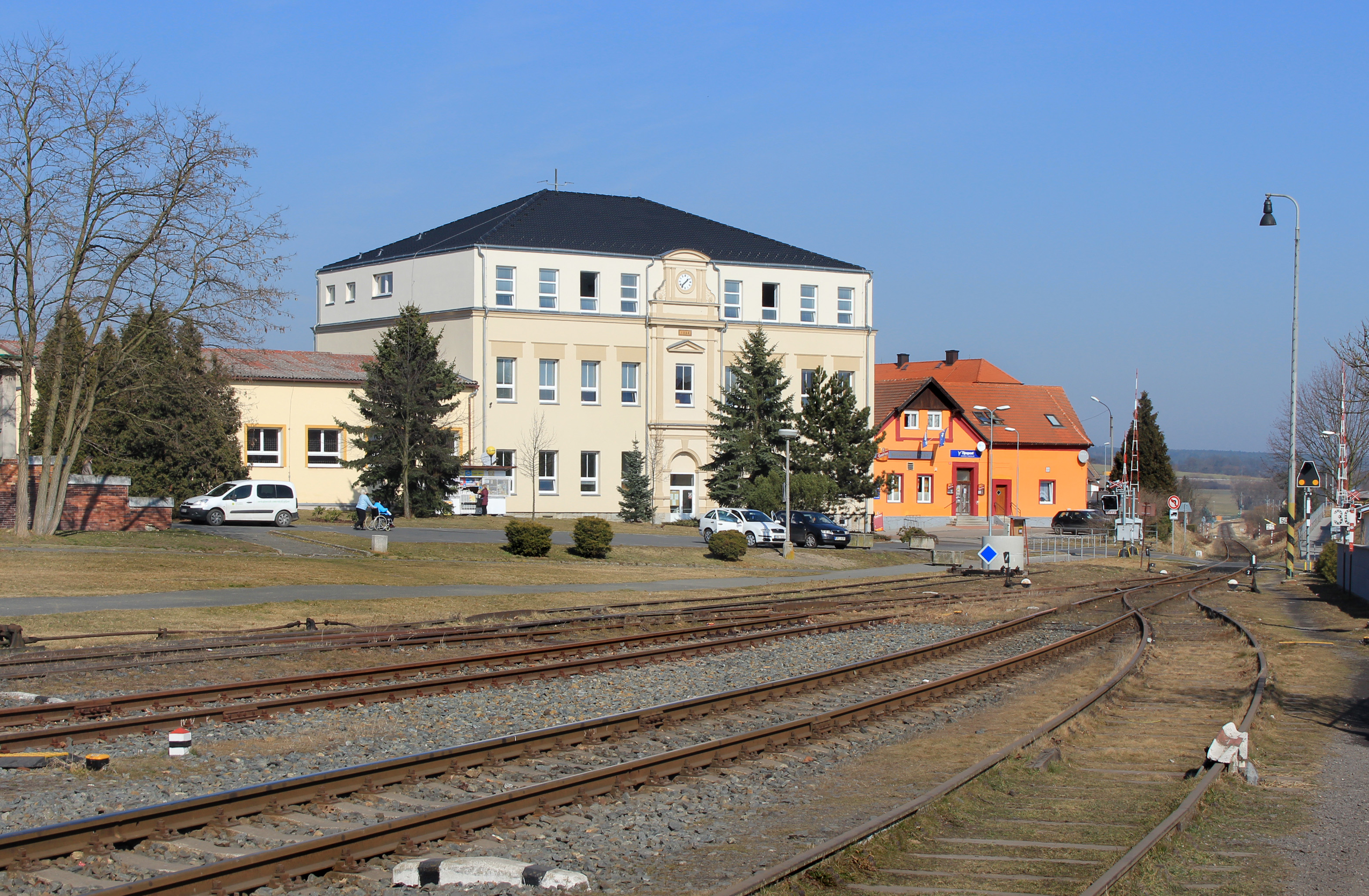
Primary school

The D5 motorway from Plzeň to the Czech–German border in Rozvadov runs through the northern part of the municipal territory.

A short railway line of local importance from Nýřany terminates here.

== Sights ==
The most important monument is the Church of Saint Martin in Horní Sekyřany. It was built in the Gothic style after 1375. Baroque modifications were made in 1678. The tower was added in 1704.

A valuable technical monument is the former tower water tank, built probably in 1908. Today it serves as an observation tower.
