= Cruciger lignatilis =

Scientific classification
- Kingdom: Fungi
- Division: Basidiomycota
- Class: Agaricomycetes
- Family: incertae sedis
- Genus: Cruciger; R.Kirschner & Oberw. (1999)
- Species: C. lignatilis

Binomial name
- Cruciger lignatilis R.Kirschner & Oberw. (1999)

Species of fungus

Cruciger lignatilis is an anamorph species of fungus, found growing on rotting wood in Germany. It is the only species in the genus Cruciger in the class Agaricomycetes. It has not yet been placed in any order or family. The genus name refers to the cruciform (cross-shaped) conidia.
