= Arthur Meyer (botanist) =

German botanist, cell biologist and pharmacognosist

Arthur Meyer (1850–1922) was a German botanist, cell biologist, and pharmacognosist. Meyer is known for his pioneering work describing the structure of chloroplasts (which Meyer called "autoplasts") and other plastids. He was the first to name and describe the chlorophyll-containing structures in chloroplasts known as grana.

Meyer spent his academic career at the University of Marburg, where he was a member of the school's Marburg Circle, an interdisciplinary biological discussion group centered on Emil von Behring.

== Works ==
- Wissenschaftliche Drogenkunde : ein illustriertes Lehrbuch der Pharmakognosie u. eine wissenschaftliche Anleitung zur eingehenden botanischen Untersuchung pflanzlicher Drogen für Apotheker. Band 1 . Gaertner, Berlin 1891 Digital edition by the University and State Library Düsseldorf
- Wissenschaftliche Drogenkunde : ein illustriertes Lehrbuch der Pharmakognosie u. eine wissenschaftliche Anleitung zur eingehenden botanischen Untersuchung pflanzlicher Drogen für Apotheker. Band 2 . Gaertner, Berlin 1892 Digital edition by the University and State Library Düsseldorf
