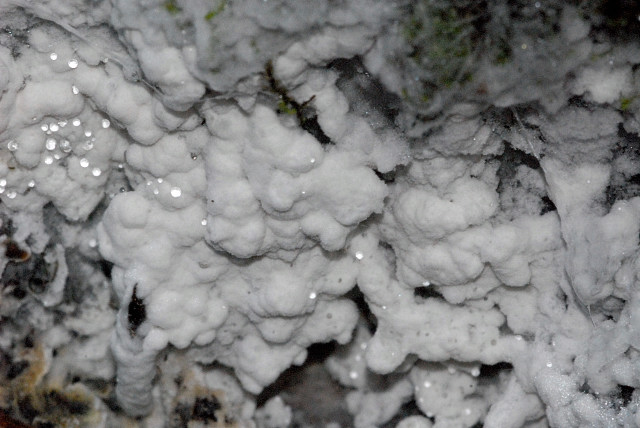

Scientific classification
- Kingdom: Fungi
- Division: Basidiomycota
- Class: Agaricomycetes
- Subclass: Agaricomycetidae
- Order: Atheliales; Jülich 1981

Families
- Atheliaceae; Lobuliciaceae; Byssocorticiaceae; Pilodermataceae; Tylosporaceae

= Atheliales =

Order of fungi

Atheliales is an order of mostly corticioid or athelioid fungi placed under the Agaricomycetidae subclass. It was first described by Walter Jülich in 1981 along with 4 families, Lobuliciaceae, Atheliaceae, Byssocorticiaceae and Pilodermataceae. Another family was discovered in 2020 called Tylosporaceae. It contains roughly 100 described species in 20 genera with varied ecological diversity. Most species have relatively simple gross morphology and do not have a lot of diagnostic characters. They produce crust-like fruiting bodies attached loosely to their substrate.

== Taxonomy ==
Traditionally, the classification of basidiomycetes placed significant emphasis on readily observable features, such as the construction of the basidiocarp or the hymenophore. In 1981, Jülich introduced the order Atheliales among other new families and orders, in an attempt to classify the higher order of basidiomycetes. The order Atheliales was later found to be closely related to the Agaricales and Boletales, forming the monophyletic group known as the subclass Agaricomycetidae (class Agaricomycotina) in a 2007 study.
