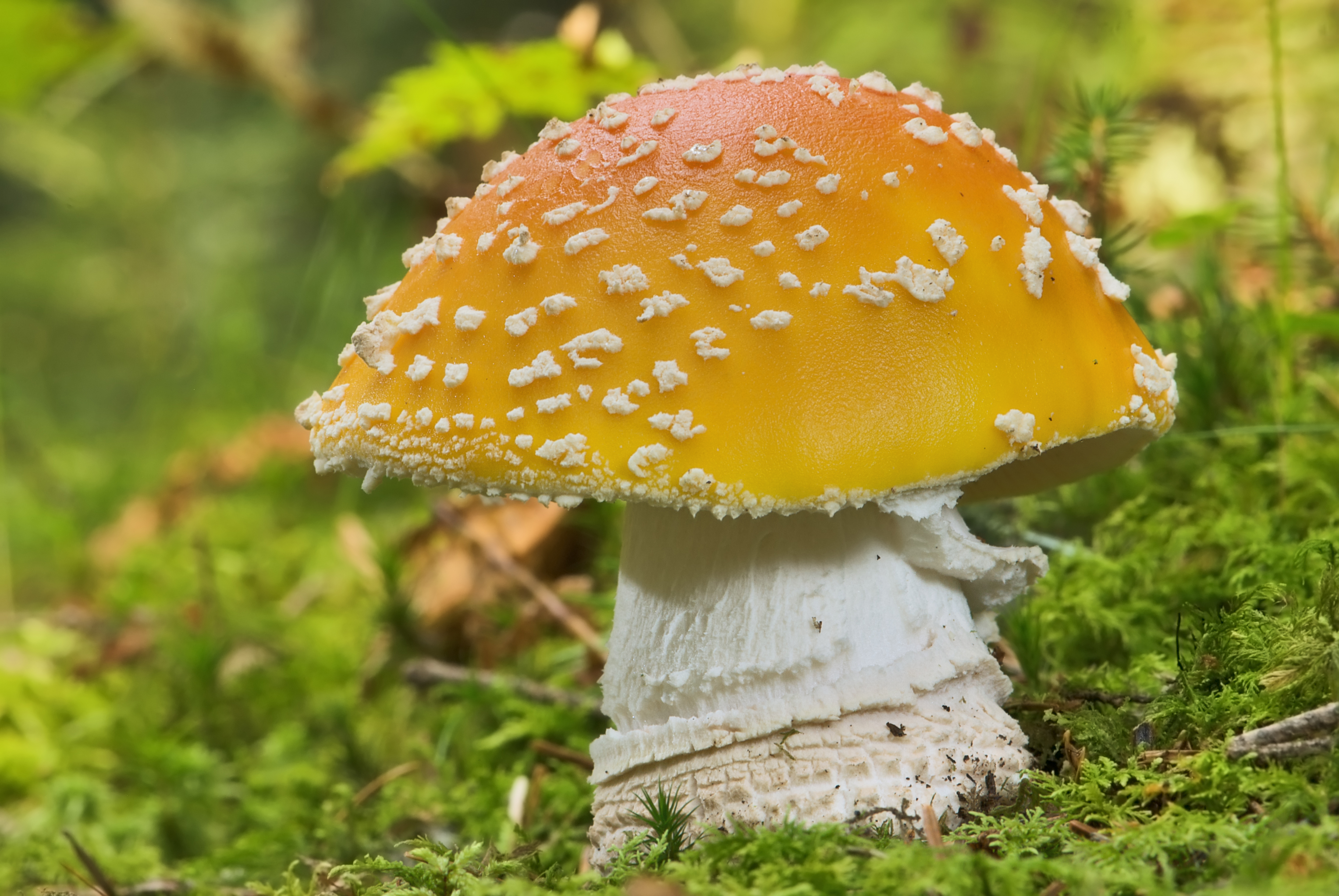
- Amanita muscaria (Agaricales)

Scientific classification
- Kingdom: Fungi
- Division: Basidiomycota
- Subdivision: Agaricomycotina
- Class: Agaricomycetes; Doweld (2001)

Subclasses/orders
- Agaricomycetidae Agaricales (32 fam., 410+ gen.) Amylocorticiales (1 fam., 14 gen.) Atheliales (1 fam., 22 gen.) Boletales (16 fam., 95+ gen.) Jaapiales (1 fam., 1 gen.) Lepidostromatales (1 fam., 3 gen.) Phallomycetidae Geastrales (1 fam., 8 gen.) Gomphales (3 fam., 18 gen.) Hysterangiales (5 fam., 18 gen.) Phallales (2 fam., 26 gen.) incertae sedis (no subclass) Auriculariales (6–7 fam., 30+ gen.) Cantharellales (7 fam., 39 gen.) Corticiales (3 fam., 30+ gen.) Gloeophyllales (1 fam., 7 gen.) Hymenochaetales (3 fam., 50+ gen.) Polyporales (9 fam., ~200 gen.) Russulales (12 fam., 80+ gen.) Sebacinales (1 fam., 8 gen.) Stereopsidales (1 fam., 2 gen.) Thelephorales (2 fam., 18 gen.) Trechisporales (1 fam., 15 gen.) Tremellodendropsidales (1 fam., 1 gen.)

= Agaricomycetes =

Agaricomycetes Temporal range: Barremian–present

Class of fungi

The Agaricomycetes are a class of fungi in the division Basidiomycota. The taxon is roughly identical to that defined for the Homobasidiomycetes (alternatively called holobasidiomycetes) by Hibbett & Thorn, with the inclusion of Auriculariales and Sebacinales. It includes not only mushroom-forming fungi, but also most species placed in the deprecated taxa Gasteromycetes and Homobasidiomycetes. Within the subdivision Agaricomycotina, which already excludes the smut and rust fungi, the Agaricomycetes can be further defined by the exclusion of the classes Tremellomycetes and Dacrymycetes, which are generally considered to be jelly fungi. However, a few former "jelly fungi", such as Auricularia, are classified in the Agaricomycetes. According to a 2008 estimate, Agaricomycetes include 17 orders, 100 families, 1147 genera, and about 21000 species. Modern molecular phylogenetic analyses have been since used to help define several new orders in the Agaricomycetes: Amylocorticiales, Jaapiales, Stereopsidales, and Lepidostromatales.

== Classification ==
Although morphology of the mushroom or fruit body (basidiocarp) was the basis of early classification of the Agaricomycetes, this is no longer the case. As an example, the distinction between the Gasteromycetes (including puffballs) and Agaricomycetes (most other agaric mushrooms) is no longer recognized as a natural one—various puffball species have apparently evolved independently from agaricomycete fungi. However, most mushroom guide books still group the puffballs or gasteroid forms separate from other mushrooms because the older Friesian classification is still convenient for categorizing fruit body forms. Similarly, modern classifications divide the gasteroid order Lycoperdales between Agaricales and Phallales.

== Features ==
All members of the class produce basidiocarps which range in size from tiny cups a few millimeters across to a giant polypore (Phellinus ellipsoideus) greater than several meters across and weigh up to 500 kilograms (1,100 lb). The group also includes what are arguably the largest and oldest individual organisms on earth: the mycelium of one individual Armillaria gallica has been estimated to extend over 15 hectares (37 acres) with a mass of 10,000 kilograms (22,000 pounds) and an age of 1,500 years.

Agaricomycetes also have antibacterial properties. Agaricomycetes can help in research in treating bacteria.

== Ecology ==
Nearly all species are terrestrial (a few are aquatic), occurring in a wide range of environments where most function as decayers, especially of wood. However, some species are pathogenic or parasitic, and yet others are symbiotic (i.e., mutualistic), these including the important ectomycorrhizal symbionts of forest trees. General discussions on the forms and life cycles of these fungi are developed in the article on mushrooms, in the treatments of the various orders (links in table at right), and in individual species accounts.

== Evolution ==
A study of 5,284 species with a backbone phylogeny based on 104 genomes has suggested the following dates of evolution:

Agaricomycetidae ~185 million years ago (174 million years ago–192 million years ago)
Cantharellales 184 million years ago (144 million years ago–261 million years ago)
Agaricales 173 million years ago (160 million years ago-182 million years ago)
Hymenochaetales 167 million years ago (130 million years ago–180 million years ago)
Boletales 142 million years ago (133 million years ago–153 million years ago)

== Fossil record ==
The fruit bodies of Agaricomycetes are extremely rare in the fossil record, and the class does not yet pre-date the Early Cretaceous (146–100 Ma). The oldest Agaricomycetes fossil, dating from the lower Cretaceous (130–125 Ma) is Quatsinoporites. It is a fragment of a poroid fruit body with features that suggest it could be a member of the family Hymenochaetaceae. Based on molecular clock analysis, the Agaricomycetes are estimated to be about 290 million years old.

=== Phylogeny ===
Modern molecular phylogenetics suggest the following relationships:

- - other basidiomycetes (outgroup)
  - Agaricomycetes
    - Cantharellales
    - - Sebacinales
      - - Auriculariales
        - - - Stereopsidales
            - Phallomycetidae
              - Geastrales
              - - Hysterangiales
                - - Gomphales
                  - Phallales
          - - Trechisporales
            - - Hymenochaetales
              - - - Thelephorales
                  - Polyporales
                - - - Corticiales
                    - - Jaapiales
                      - Gloeophyllales
                  - - Russulales
                    - Agaricomycetidae
                      - Agaricales
                      - - Boletales
                        - - Amylocorticiales
                          - - Lepidostromatales
                            - Atheliales

== Genera incertae sedis ==
There are many genera in the Agaricomycetes that have not been classified in any order or family. These include:

- Akenomyces
- Aldridgea
- Anixia
- Arrasia
- Arthrodochium
- Arualis
- Atraporiella
- Cenangiomyces
- Ceraceopsis
- Corticomyces
- Cruciger
- Dendrosporomyces
- Ellula
- Fibulochlamys
- Fibulocoela
- Fibulotaeniella
- Geotrichopsis
- Gloeoradulum
- Gloeosynnema
- Glomerulomyces
- Glutinoagger
- Grandinia
- Granulocystis
- Hallenbergia
- Hyphobasidiofera
- Hypolyssus
- Intextomyces
- Korupella
- Minostroscyta
- Mylittopsis
- Odonticium
- Pagidospora
- Peniophorella
- Phlyctibasidium
- Pseudasterodon
- Purpureocorticium S.H.Wu (2017)
- Pycnovellomyces
- Resinicium
- Riessia
- Riessiella
- Skvortzovia
- Taiwanoporia
- Timgrovea
- Titaeella
- Trechinothus
- Tricladiomyces
- Trimitiella
- Tubulicrinopsis
- Xanthoporus
- Xenosoma
