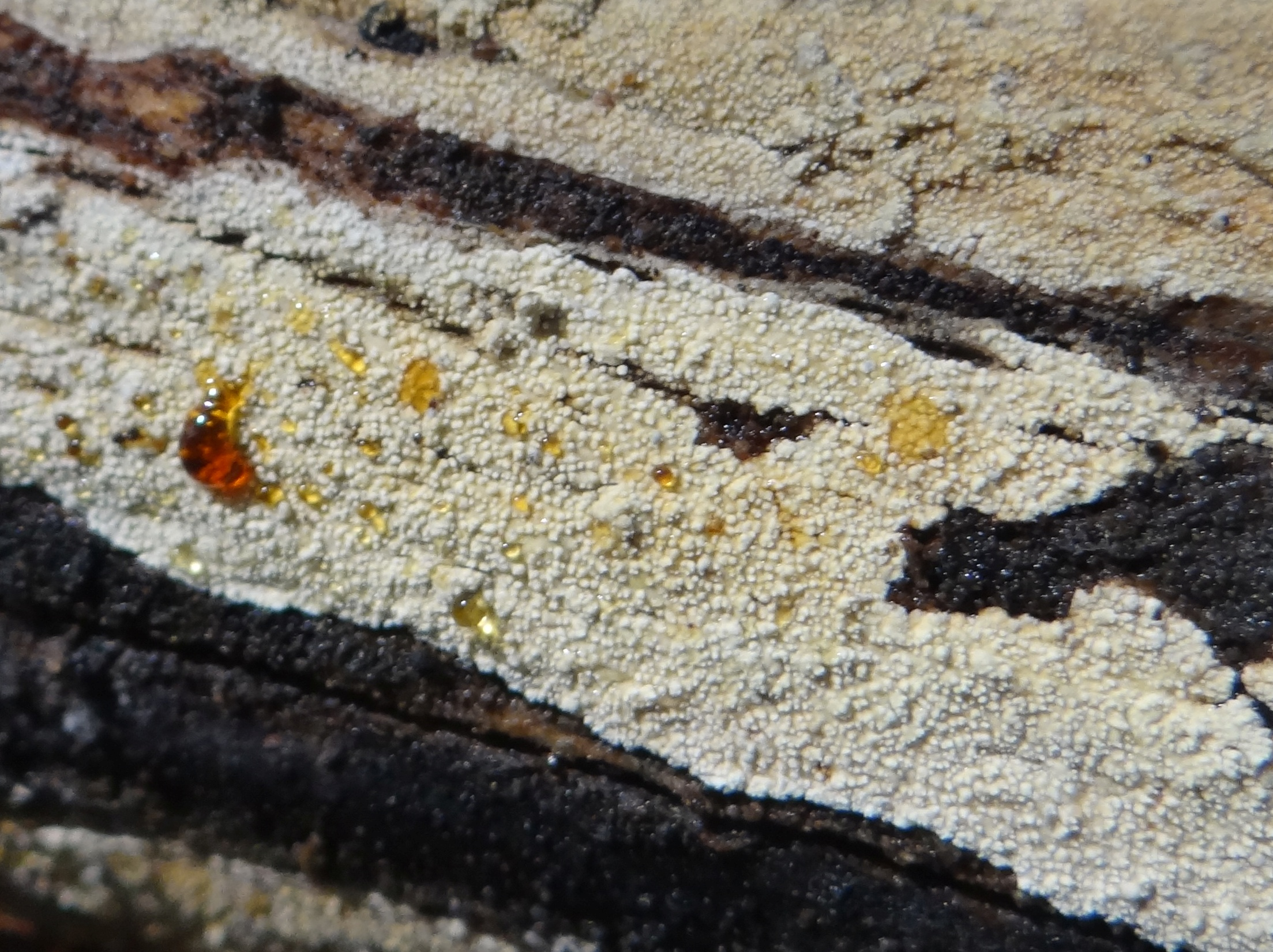
- Brevicellicium olivascens found in Rajbrot, Poland

Scientific classification
- Kingdom: Fungi
- Division: Basidiomycota
- Class: Agaricomycetes
- Order: Trechisporales
- Family: Hydnodontaceae
- Genus: Brevicellicium
- Species: B. olivascens

Binomial name
- Brevicellicium olivascens (Bres.) K.H.Larss. & Hjortstam (1978)

Synonyms
- List: Odontia olivascens Bres. (1892); Corticium sulphurellum Höhn. & Litsch. (1908); Grandinia abrotani Velen. (1922); Odontia chromoflava Rick (1932); Cristella mutabilis f. sulphurella (Höhn. & Litsch.) Parmasto (1965)

= Brevicellicium olivascens =

Species of crust fungus

Brevicellicium olivascens is a species of crust-forming fungus in the family Hydnodontaceae that grows as thin, olive-tinted patches on decaying wood. First described by the Italian mycologist Giacomo Bresadola in 1892 as Odontia olivascens, it was later reclassified in 1978 by the Swedish mycologists Karl-Henrik Larsson and Erik Hjortstam, who created the new genus Brevicellicium (meaning "short cells") to accommodate it. This inconspicuous fungus forms delicate, web-like films only 0.1–0.3 millimetres thick that appear greyish-olive to olive-brown when fresh, becoming papery when dry, and can be identified microscopically by its distinctive two-spored reproductive cells. Though easily overlooked due to its subtle appearance, B. olivascens has a widespread distribution across Europe, North America, Asia, and Oceania, where it plays an ecological role in breaking down dead wood of broadleaf trees and woody vines.

== Taxonomy ==
Brevicellicium olivascens is a corticioid (crust-forming) fungus in the family Hydnodontaceae (order Trechisporales). It was originally described by Giacomo Bresadola in 1892 under the name Odontia olivascens, owing to its olive-tinged colouration. In 1978, the Swedish mycologists Karl-Henrik Larsson and Erik Hjortstam studied Bresadola's fungus and transferred it to a new genus, Brevicellicium, as Brevicellicium olivascens. The genus name refers to the short basidia ("brevi-cellicium") characteristic of these fungi. B. olivascens is the type species of Brevicellicium. Molecular phylogenetics confirm that Brevicellicium belongs in Trechisporales, separate from the classical Corticiaceae. The species has a widespread distribution and is considered cosmopolitan, but it is most frequently recorded in Europe.

== Description ==
Brevicellicium olivascens forms thin, patchy resupinate fruit bodies that adhere to the substrate (wood). The fruiting body is a crust or film that can cover several square centimetres, with a thickness of only 0.1–0.3 mm. It often appears as an irregular, web-like patch on the underside of decaying wood. Fresh areas of the crust are pale greyish-olive to olive-brown in colour (hence olivascens, "becoming olive"). The texture is cottony to membranous when active, drying to a thin papery film. Under a hand lens, the surface may show a very fine, porulose or granulose texture (tiny bumps or pores), though Brevicellicium typically has a smooth hymenial surface with no distinct pores or teeth. The edges of the crust are indistinct, thinning out to whitish mycelium. B. olivascens does not have stems, caps, or any differentiated structures – it is entirely crustose.

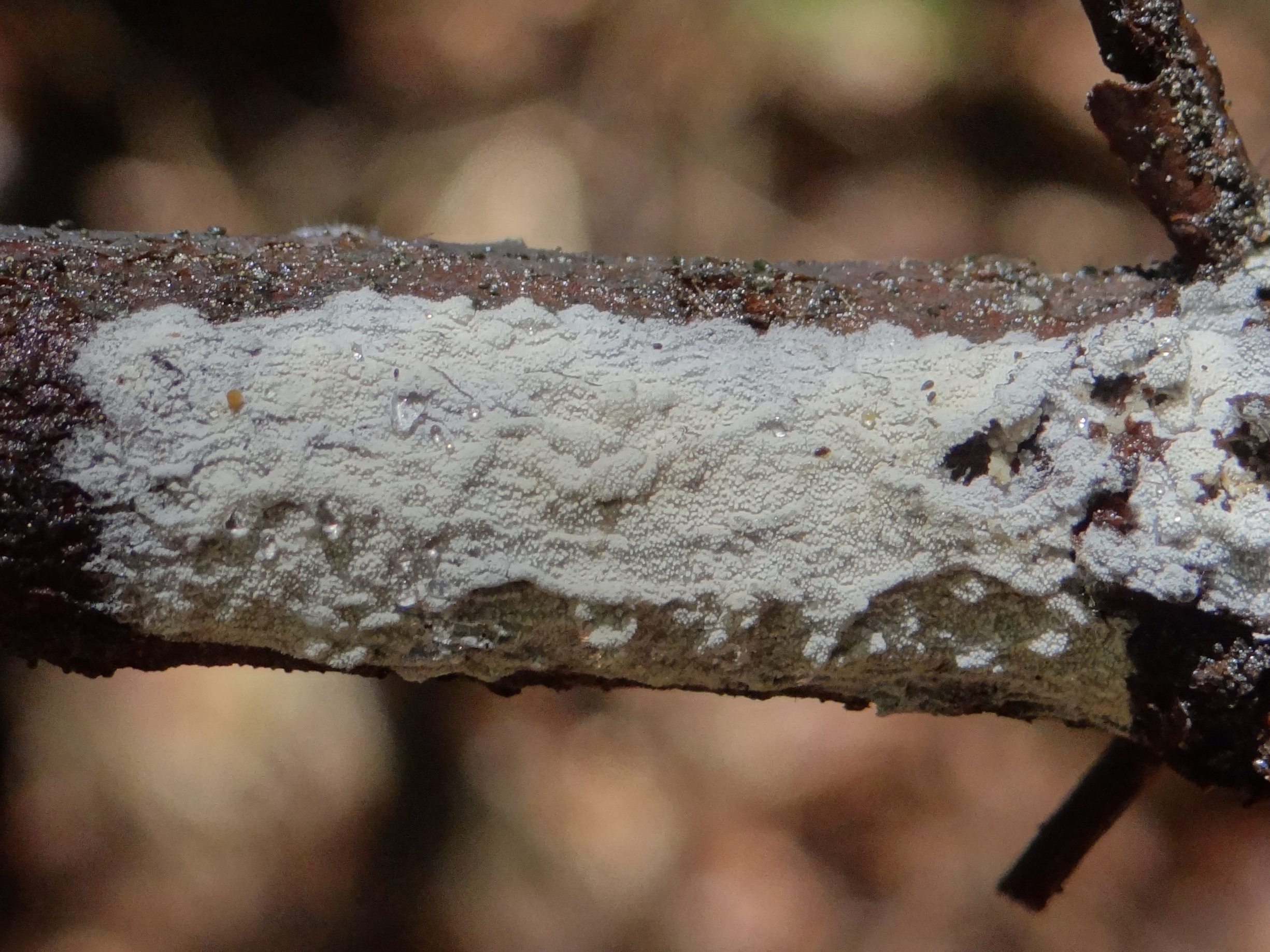
Brevicellicium olivascens found in Stare Rybie, Poland

Microscopically, it is characterized by short cylindrical basidia and ellipsoid spores about 4–6 μm long. The basidia bear only two spores each (biannulate basidia), a distinctive feature of Hydnodontaceae. The spores are smooth, thin-walled, and typically non-amyloid. Cystidia (sterile cells) are absent or inconspicuous. The hyphae have clamp connections. When a small piece of the crust is placed in potassium hydroxide (KOH) solution, it may exude a yellowish or olive tint. B. olivascens is not conspicuous in the field – one usually notices a faint olive discolouration on wood, which under a microscope reveals the fertile basidia. It can be confused with other corticioid fungi; the combination of olive colouration and microscopic traits is needed to identify it.

== Habitat and distribution ==
Brevicellicium olivascens is saprotrophic, growing on decaying wood of broadleaf trees and woody vines. The species has a European distribution – it is recorded widely across Europe from Italy (the type locality) and France up to Scandinavia. Bresadola's original specimens came from Trento, Italy, on decayed wood. It likely occurs throughout temperate Europe anywhere suitable decaying wood habitat exists. Outside Europe, B. olivascens is considered cosmopolitan: it has been identified in North America, Asia, and Oceania in forest surveys.
