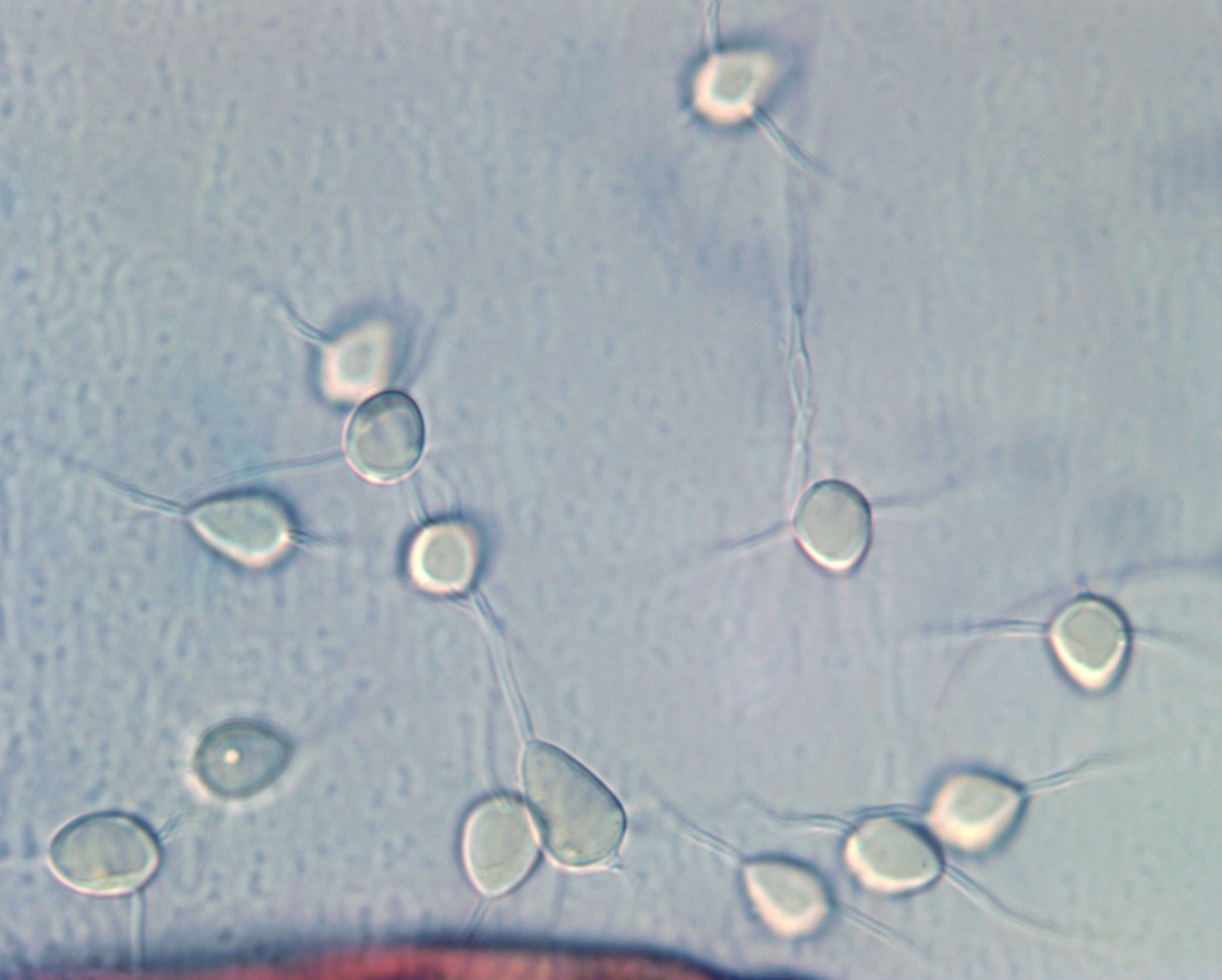
- N. vibrissa

Scientific classification
- Domain: Eukaryota
- Kingdom: Fungi
- Division: Basidiomycota
- Class: Agaricomycetes
- Order: Agaricales
- Family: Niaceae
- Genus: Nia
- Species: N. vibrissa

Binomial name
- Nia vibrissa R.T. Moore & Meyers

= Nia vibrissa =

Species of fungus

Nia vibrissa is a species of fungus in the order Agaricales. The species is adapted to a marine environment and is a wood-rotting fungus, producing small, gasteroid basidiocarps (fruit bodies) on driftwood, submerged timber, mangrove wood, and similar substrates. The spores have long, hair-like projections and are widely dispersed in sea water, giving Nia vibrissa a cosmopolitan distribution.

== Taxonomy ==
Nia vibrissa was originally described in 1959 from submerged wood off the coast of Florida. The Latin epithet "vibrissa" (meaning "bristly") refers to the hair-like appendages on the spores. It was initially thought to be a deuteromycete (an asexual or mould-like fungus), but was subsequently found to be the sexual state of a basidiomycete, one of the few such known from the marine environment. Since its fruit bodies are enclosed and its spores are passively released, Nia vibrissa was considered to be a gasteromycete and was placed in its own family within the Melanogastrales, a now obsolete order of terrestrial false truffles.

DNA sequencing has since shown that the species is actually related to species of cyphelloid fungi and agarics within the Agaricales.

== Description ==
Fruit bodies are more or less spherical, yellow-orange to orange-brown, 1–4 mm across. The remarkable spores are oval, 10–15 by 6.5–8.5 μm with 4–5 bristle-like appendages up to 40 μm long.

== Habitat and distribution ==
The species is widely distributed in the Atlantic Ocean, the Mediterranean Sea, the Indian Ocean, and the Pacific Ocean.

Nia vibrissa has been shown to be a wood-rotting species and was first obtained by leaving wooden "baits" in the sea, retrieving them after a period of time, and then examining them in the laboratory. Other records of the fungus have come from a similar methodology, but it has also been found widely on dead mangrove wood and on natural driftwood. Fruit bodies of the fungus were found on wood salvaged from the wreck of King Henry VIII's 16th-century warship, the Mary Rose.
