= Boidinella =

Scientific classification
- Kingdom: Fungi
- Division: Basidiomycota
- Class: Agaricomycetes
- Order: Trechisporales
- Family: Hydnodontaceae
- Genus: Boidinella; Nakasone (2011)

Type species
- Boidinella globulispora (Boidin & Lanq.) Nakasone (2011)

Species
- B. cystidiolophora B. globulispora

Genus of fungi

Boidinella is a genus of fungi in the family Hydnodontaceae. The genus was described in 2011 by mycologist Karen Nakasone to contain B. cystidiolophora (formerly Sistotremella) and the type species B. globulispora (formerly a member of Dendrothele). These species have soft, effused (spread out flat) fruit bodies and spherical to ellipsoid basidiospores that have smooth, hyaline (translucent) and cyanophilous walls. The genus name honors French mycologist Jacques Boidin.
