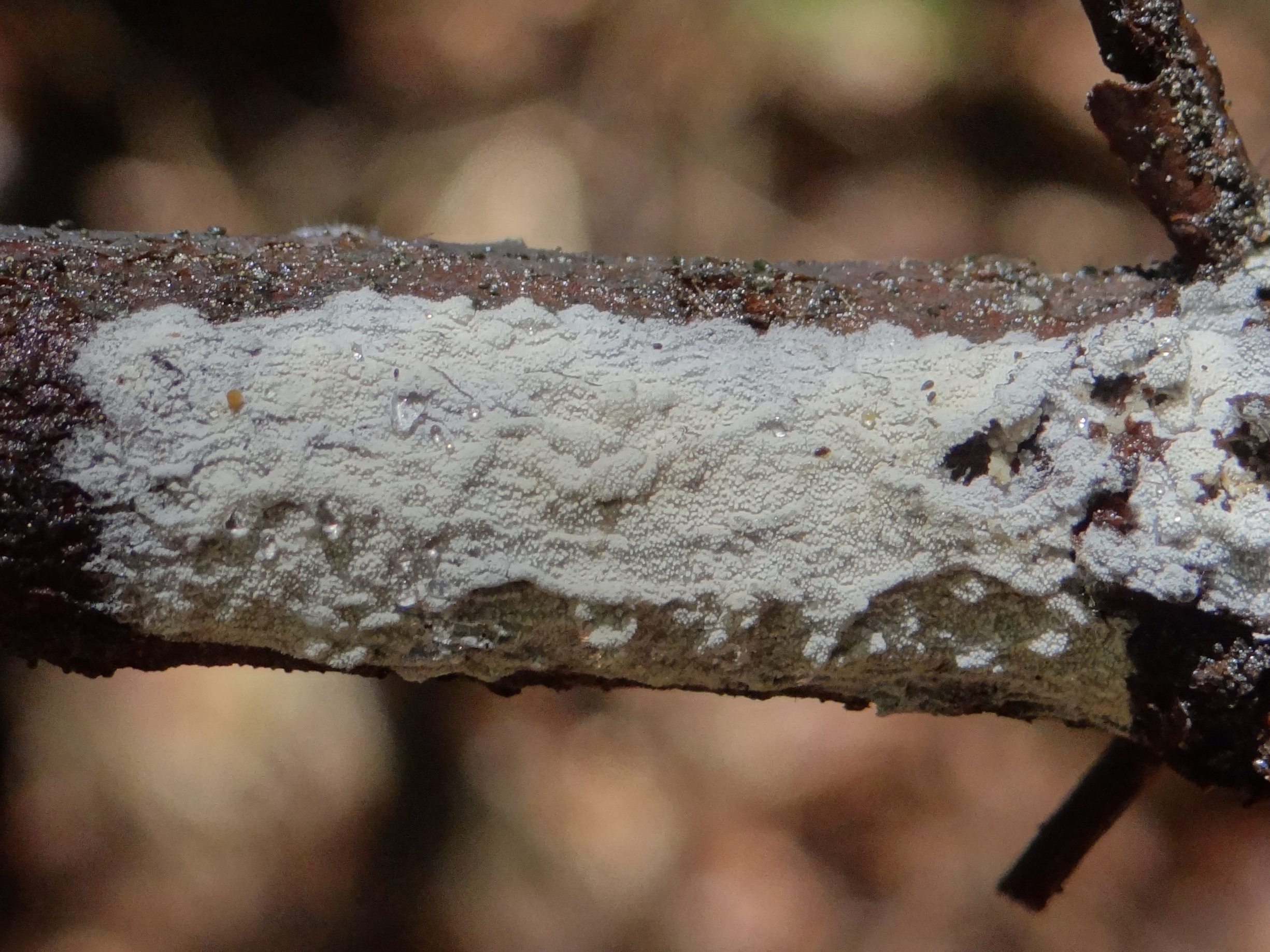
- Brevicellicium olivascens found in Stare Rybie, Poland

Scientific classification
- Kingdom: Fungi
- Division: Basidiomycota
- Class: Agaricomycetes
- Order: Trechisporales
- Family: Hydnodontaceae
- Genus: Brevicellicium; K.H.Larss. & Hjortstam (1978)

Type species
- Brevicellicium exile (H.S.Jacks.) K.H.Larss. & Hjortstam (1978)

Species
- B. allantosporum; B. asperum; B. exile; B. flavovirens; B. mellinum; B. molle; B. olivascens; B. permodicum; B. udinum; B. uncinatum; B. viridulum; B. vulcanense

= Brevicellicium =

Genus of fungi

Brevicellicium is a genus of fungi in the family Hydnodontaceae. The genus has a collectively widespread distribution, and contains 13 species.
