= Luella Weresub =

Canadian mycologist

Luella Kayla Weresub, Ph.D. (1918 – 1979) was a world authority on the botanical nomenclature of fungi, especially corticioid fungi and sclerotium-producing basidiomycetes. She was a mycologist at the Central Experimental Farm, Ottawa, with Canada’s federal department of agriculture (now Agriculture and Agri-Food Canada). Her influence on Canadian mycology and her concern with public education are recognized in the Canadian Botanical Association’s annual Luella K. Weresub lecture in Mycology and the Weresub Prize awarded for the best student paper published by a Canadian student in mycology.

== Biography ==
Weresub was a scholar, rights defender and survivor. She was born on 29 March 1918 in Zolotonosha, Russia (now part of Ukraine), at the end of World War I (during the Russian Revolution) to Jewish parents, Marcus (Mendel) Weresub and Clara (née Rabinovitch) Weresub. They emigrated to Canada in 1923 during a period of increasing antisemitism following the Ukrainian War of Independence. They first settled in Hubbard, Saskatchewan. Luella was originally transcribed as "Louella" and "Kayla" as "Keila", and friends occasionally wrote "Dear Lou" or "Lu". She attended a two-room school with her older sister, Matilda, in Regina at age 5, refusing to be separated from her sister, and later attending school in Winnipeg. She quickly learned to speak English and by the end of the year was top in her class. At age 16 she won a scholarship for studies in Latin and another national scholarship (Watson Scholarship) to Queen's University, but had to defer her studies due to her sister’s appendicitis that occurred in transit in 1935 in Sault Ste. Marie, Ontario. Her scholarship was deferred for one year while she worked.

She attended Queen's University in 1936–37, but her studies were further delayed by family financial issues (during the 1930s Great Depression). She worked at her father's store in Arntfield, Quebec (1937–38), that eventually went bankrupt. She returned to Sault Ste. Marie worked at radio station CJIC (1940–41) and then radio station CHML (1941–47) in Hamilton, Ontario. One of her programs, Sewing School of the Air, which promoted sewing to save money during the Second World War, was advertised in 1942 in Broadcasting, The Weekly Magazine of Radio under the name "Louella Weresub". She re-entered Queen’s University in 1947 and earned her B.A. in Biology in 1950. During her four years attending Queen’s she was awarded the University Scholarship, W.W Near Scholarship in Biology, Queen’s Medal in Biology, and Arts Research Travelling Fellowship.

During the summer of 1950 she worked for the Defense Research Board (National Research Council) in Kingston, Ontario, as arranged by Prof. Herbert S. Jackson, a mycologist and head of the Botany Department at the University of Toronto. Her research on corticioid fungi began under mentorship by Jackson at the University of Toronto, but he died suddenly in December 1951. She finished her M.A. with Prof. Roy F. Cain in 1952. Further employment with the Government of Canada in 1952 was derailed and then deferred by the political climate of the day in North America, now termed McCarthyism. Consequently, she became a lecturer at the Department of Botany of the University of Manitoba for three years, and was greatly supported and assisted by Prof. D. L. Bailey of the University of Toronto and Dr. J. Walton Groves with the mycology unit in Ottawa who wished to employ her in 1952.

She returned to the University of Toronto in 1955 and completed her Ph.D. in two years (1957), evidently accumulating credit for research while at the University of Manitoba. She finally joined the mycology unit of the Department of Agriculture in Ottawa on May 21, 1957. She was employed there until her death on 30 October 1979 from complications of pneumonia following an operation for lung cancer. She is buried in the Jewish Memorial Cemetery in Osgoode, Ontario.

== Career in mycology ==
Her list of formal research papers is relatively modest but influential. Both her MA and PhD theses were on the corticioid genus Peniophora sect. Tubuliferae (now Tubulicrinis), as were her early publications. She went on to develop expertise on other corticioid fungi. Well ahead of modern phylogenetic analyses, she and Bryce Kendrick published an exploratory paper on numerical taxonomy, "Attempting Neo-Adansonian computer taxonomy at the ordinal level in Basidiomycetes", in 1966. Her studies on corticioid fungi led her to investigated sclerotium-producing Basidiomycetes, first among the corticioid fungi and then among other groups such as Typhula. She whimsically and imaginatively named the fungus genus Minimedusa because of its "medusoid" (like the mythical decapitated Medusa’s head) tangled hyphae forming the bulbil. Her work involved major taxonomic revisions and studies on applied pathology problems.

Her last two publications were printed posthumously, one on the apple rot fungus Corticium centrifugum and the other on nomenclature with John McNeill, who had learned his nomenclature along with her and would become senior editor of the International Code of Nomenclature for algae, fungi, and plants. Notably, much of her time went into uncompromising reviews of manuscripts and theses. She picked her way through botanical nomenclature and spent countless hours helping others with nomenclatural problems. Luella worked to make the International Botanical Code of Nomenclature (now the International Code of Nomenclature for algae, fungi, and plants) more easily understood, less equivocal, more comprehensive, and hence more useful. As a world authority on botanical nomenclature, especially as it applies to fungi, she was an active member of the Nomenclature Committee of the Mycological Society of America, of the International Association for Plant Taxonomy's Nomenclature Committee for Fungi and Lichens, and of the International Mycological Association's Nomenclature Secretariat.

She was the chair of the Subcommittee on Article 59—on the naming of pleomorphic fungi—and contributed substantially to the international discussion on starting point dates for fungi and on palaeomycological nomenclature. Among other accomplishments, she helped coin the terms "anamorph" and "teleomorph". Weresub was a very active member of the Canadian Botanical Association/Association Botanical du Canada, serving as a Director from 1971 to 1973. She participated in nomenclature sessions of Botanical Congresses at Edinburgh, Montreal, and Seattle as well as the mycological Congresses at Exeter and Tampa.

== Honours and awards ==
The Canadian Botanical Association/Association Botanical du Canada has established an award in her honour. The University of Toronto Department of Botany also established the L.W. Weresub Memorial Fund. The fungal genus Luellia K. H. Larsson & Hjortstam was named in 1974 in honor of her contributions to the study of corticioid Basidiomycetes, and posthumously the fungal species Harknessia weresubiae Nag Raj, DiCosmo & W.B. Kendr. (1981) and Scutellospora weresubiae Koske & C. Walker (1986) were named after her as tributes by her colleagues. Extensive obituaries were published by the Mycological Society of America and the Canadian Botanical Society, and notice was posted in Taxon by the International Association of Plant Taxonomists. More recently, in 2013–2014 her contributions as a Ukrainian Canadian led to publications on her life in the Ukrainian language in both Canada and Ukraine.
