= Ripexicium =

Scientific classification
- Domain: Eukaryota
- Kingdom: Fungi
- Division: Basidiomycota
- Class: Agaricomycetes
- Order: Corticiales
- Family: Corticiaceae
- Genus: Ripexicium; Hjortstam 1995
- Species: R. spinuliferum

Binomial name
- Ripexicium spinuliferum (Jülich) Hjortstam

Synonyms
- Trechispora spinulifera Jülich 1976

Genus of fungi

Ripexicium is a genus of fungi in the family Corticiaceae. It is a monotypic genus, containing the single species Ripexicium spinuliferum, found in the Solomon Islands.
