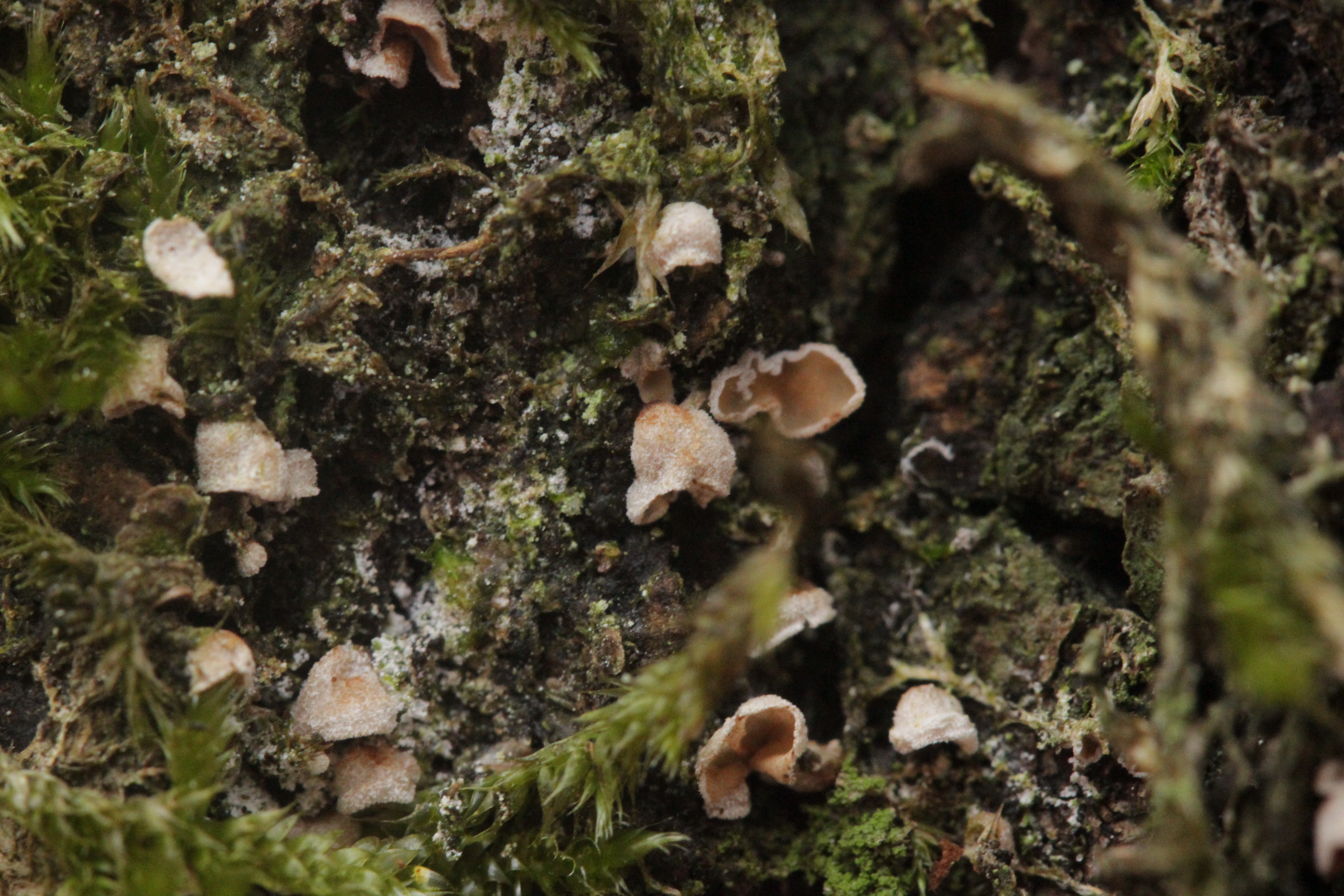

Scientific classification
- Kingdom: Fungi
- Division: Basidiomycota
- Class: Agaricomycetes
- Order: Agaricales
- Family: Chromocyphellaceae
- Genus: Chromocyphella
- Species: C. muscicola

Binomial name
- Chromocyphella muscicola (Fr.) Donk (1959)

Synonyms
- Cyphella fuscospora Curr. ex Cooke; Chaetocypha crouanii (Pat. & Doass.) Kuntze; Phaeocarpus crouanii (Pat. & Doass.) Pat.; Cyphella crouanii (Pat. & Doass.) Sacc.; Phaeocyphella muscicola (Fr.) Rea; Phaeocyphella fuscospora (Curr. ex Cooke) Rea; Cymbella crouanii Pat. & Doass.; Cyphella muscicola Fr.; Calyptella muscicola (Fr.) Quél.; Arrhenia muscicola (Fr.) Quél.; Chaetocypha muscicola (Fr.) Kuntze; Phaeocyphella crouanii (Pat. & Doass.) Pat.

= Chromocyphella muscicola =

Species of fungus

Chromocyphella muscicola is a species of fungus in the family Chromocyphellaceae. Basidiocarps (fruit bodies) are cyphelloid, cup-shaped, about 4 mm across, with an upper surface covered with fine hairs and a smooth underside.

It was first described as Cyphella muscicola by Elias Fries in 1822, and was transferred to the newly erected genus, Chromocyphella, in 1959 by Marinus Anton Donk.
