= Cyphelloid fungi =

Group of fungi

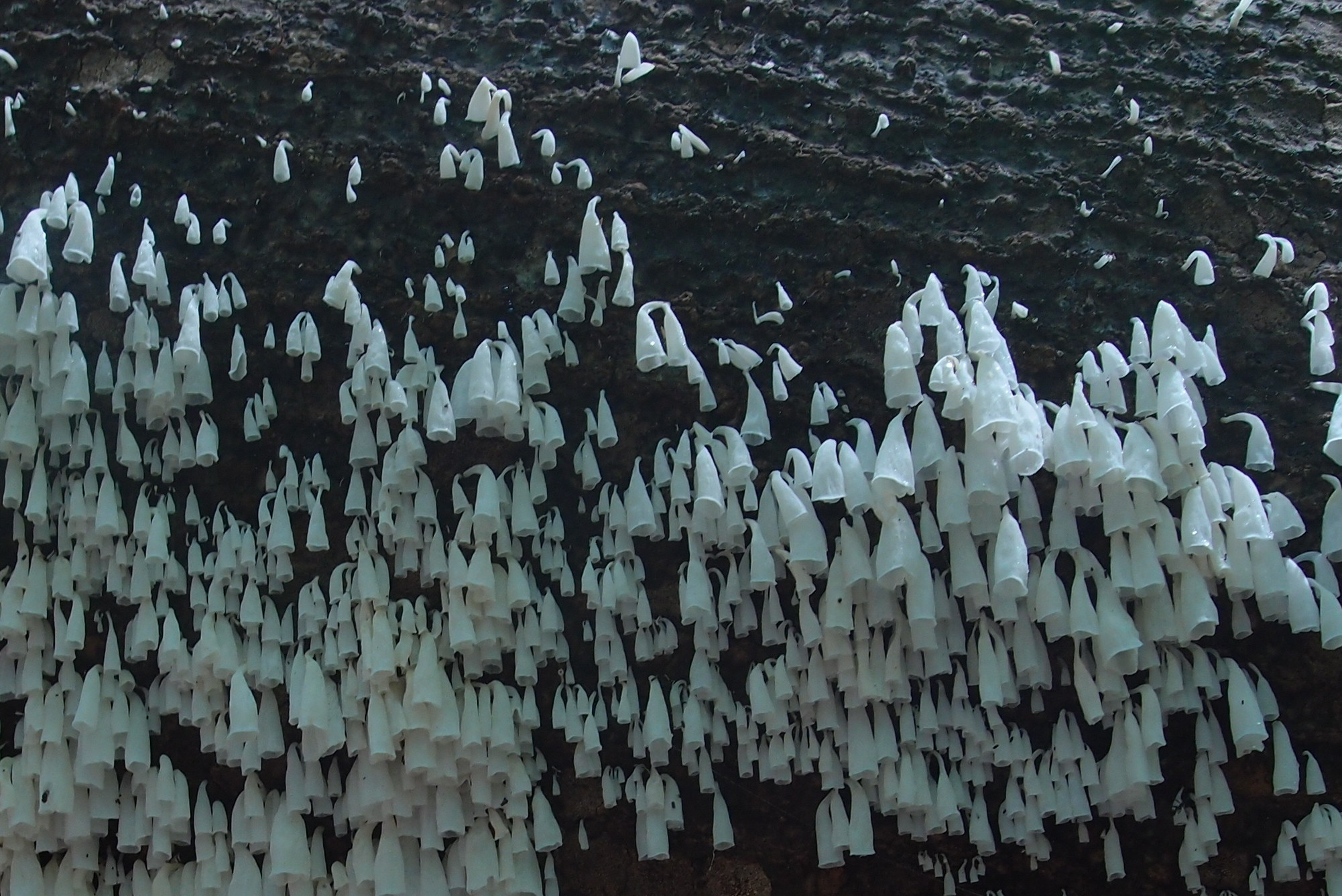
The cyphelloid fungus Calyptella longipes, Australia

The cyphelloid fungi are a polyphyletic group of fungi in the Basidiomycota that have disc-, tube-, or cup-shaped basidiocarps (fruit bodies), resembling species of discomycetes (or "cup fungi") in the Ascomycota. They were originally referred to the genus Cyphella ("cyphelloid" means Cyphella-like) and subsequently to the family Cyphellaceae, but are now known to be much more diverse and are spread through several different genera and families. Since they are often studied as a group, it is convenient to call them by the informal (non-taxonomic) name of "cyphelloid fungi". Better known cyphelloid genera include Calyptella, with stalked, cup- or bell-like fruit bodies; Lachnella, with conspicuous, hairy-margined, disc-like fruit bodies; Flagelloscypha with smaller, but equally hairy, cup-like fruit bodies; Henningsomyces with tube-like fruit bodies; and Merismodes with clustered, hairy, cup-like fruit bodies.

== History ==
The genus Cyphella was original described by Fries in 1822. Subsequent authors gradually added over 300 species to the genus. By the close of the nineteenth century, however, it was already clear that Cyphella contained a miscellany of species — some, for example, having hyaline spores, whilst others had brown spores. Segregate genera were accordingly proposed to accommodate cyphelloid fungi that were not closely related to the type, and this process continued throughout the twentieth century. The group was covered in a monograph by William Bridge Cooke in 1961, with additional papers by Donk, Reid, and Agerer. As a result of these critical revisions, only one species is still accepted in Cyphella, namely the type Cyphella digitalis.

The family name Cyphellaceae was used to keep most (but not all) of these segregate genera together. It became equally clear, however, that it too was heterogeneous, Donk noting that it was "nothing but a handy bin from which part of the contents has already been taken out and disposed of by scattering it over various groups."

DNA sequencing confirms this diversity, showing that cyphelloid fungi have independently evolved at least eight times within the Basidiomycota. Genera are currently placed in the Cyphellaceae (in a restricted sense), Inocybaceae, Marasmiaceae, Niaceae, and Tricholomataceae. It had previously been suggested that most cyphelloid fungi were related to gilled agarics (mushrooms and toadstools) and they have sometimes been referred to as "reduced agarics". DNA sequencing shows that this is indeed true for many of the genera sampled, almost all being placed within the order Agaricales.

== Description and genera ==
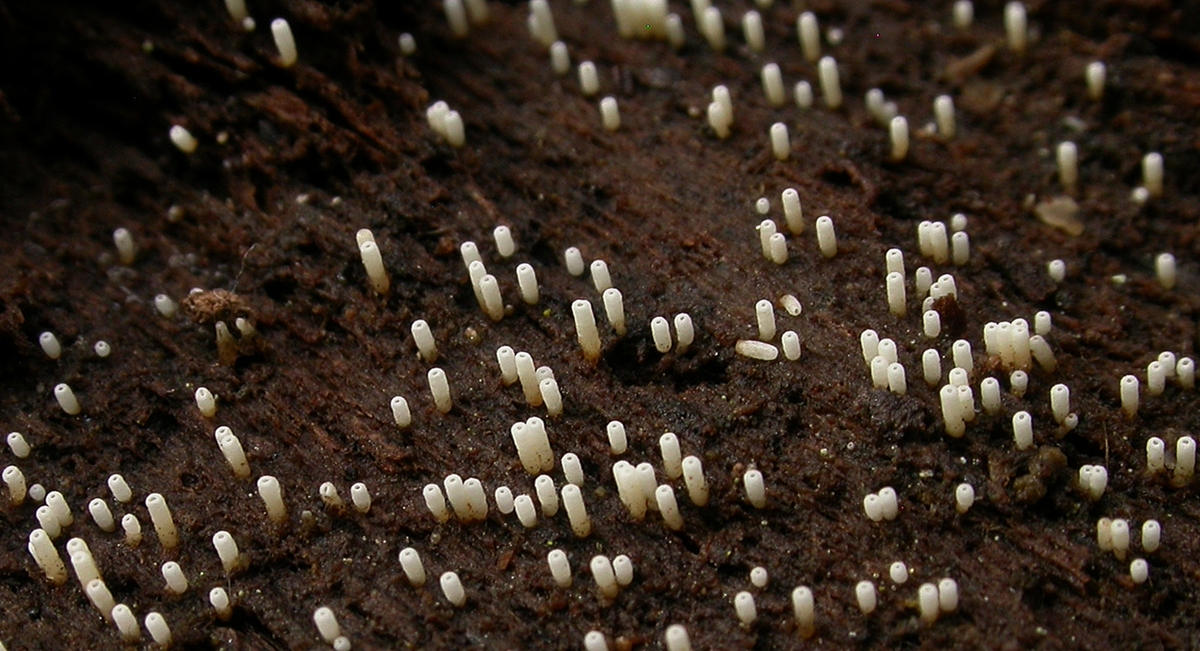
The tube-like Henningsomyces candidus, USA

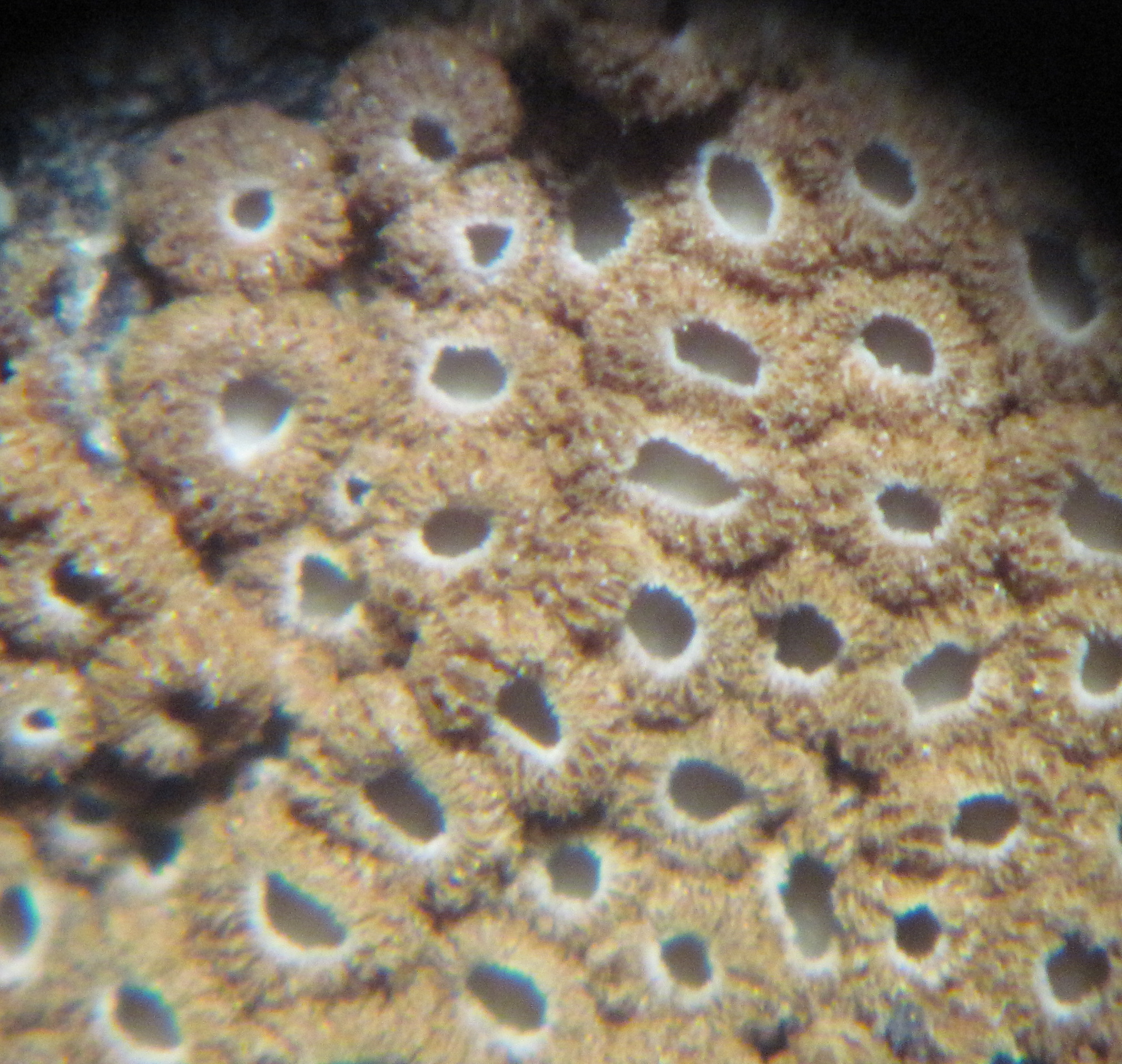
The clustered Merismodes fasciculata, USA

Fruit bodies of the cyphelloid fungi are typically small (under 10 mm across), disc-shaped, cup-shaped, or tube-like, with or without a stem. The spore-bearing surface is smooth and formed on the surface of the disc, or inside the cup or tube. The sterile outer surface is smooth or often hairy, the hairs sometimes forming a conspicuous margin to discs. Fruit bodies typically occur in troops or swarms, sometimes packed closely together.

Better known cyphelloid genera include Calyptella, with stalked, cup- or bell-like fruit bodies; Lachnella, with conspicuous, hairy-margined, disc-like fruit bodies; Flagelloscypha with smaller, but equally hairy, cup-like fruit bodies; Henningsomyces with tube-like fruit bodies; and Merismodes with clustered, hairy, cup-like fruit bodies.

== Habitat and distribution ==
Most cyphelloid species are wood-rotting fungi, growing on dead attached branches, on old bark of living trees, or on fallen wood. Some are found on dead or decaying herbaceous stems or on ferns. Two species are marine fungi, the salt-tolerant Calathella mangrovei and Halocyphina villosa occurring on mangroves.

As a group, the cyphelloid fungi are cosmopolitan, though (as with most fungi) better studied and better known in north temperate regions.
