= Sistotremastrum suecicum =

Scientific classification
- Kingdom: Fungi
- Division: Basidiomycota
- Class: Agaricomycetes
- Order: Trechisporales
- Family: Hydnodontaceae
- Genus: Sistotremastrum
- Species: S. suecicum

Binomial name
- Sistotremastrum suecicum Litsch. ex J.Erikss.

Species of fungus

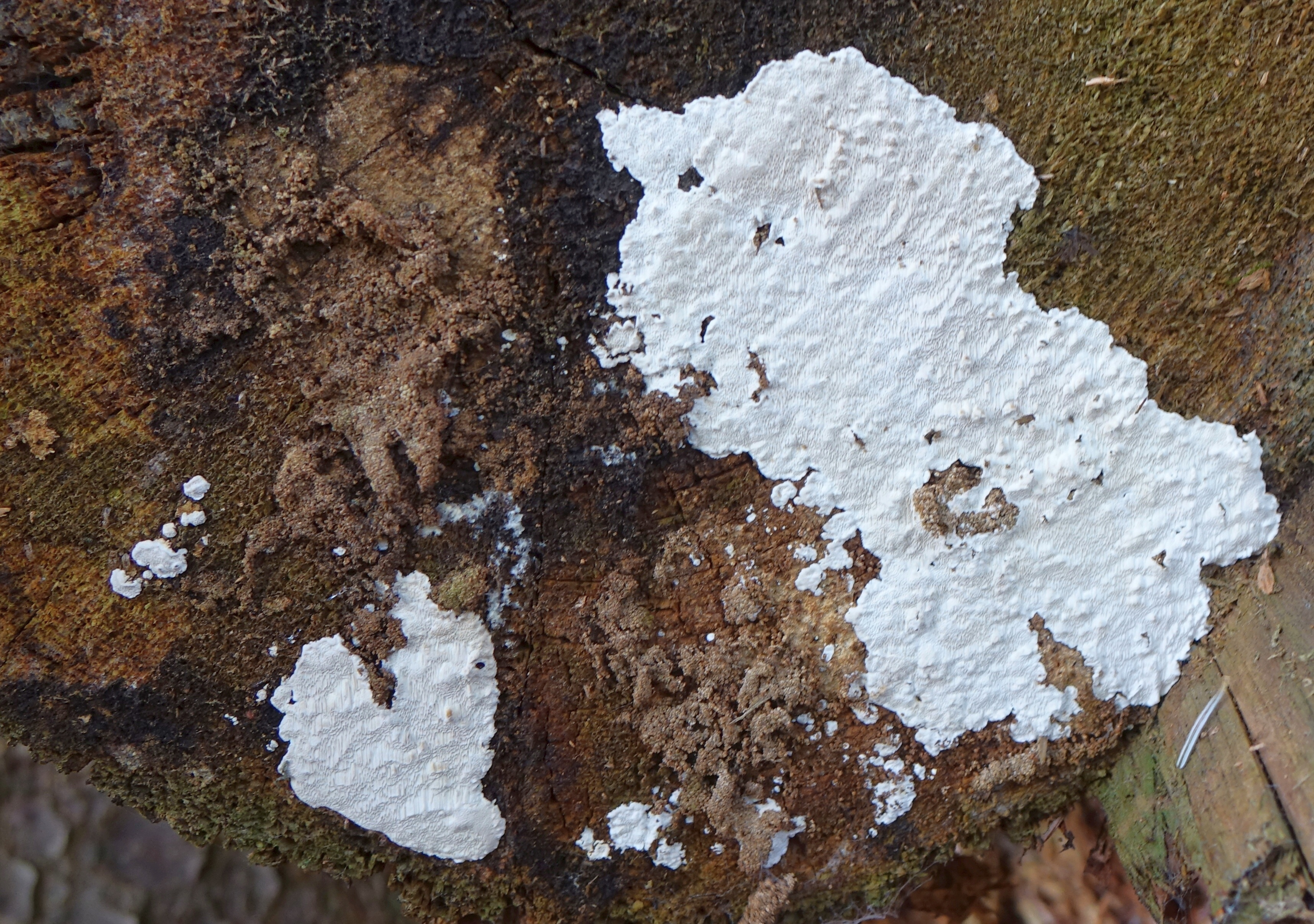
Sistotremastrum suecicum

Sistotremastrum suecicum is a species of fungus belonging to the family Hydnodontaceae.

It is native to Eurasia and Northern America.
