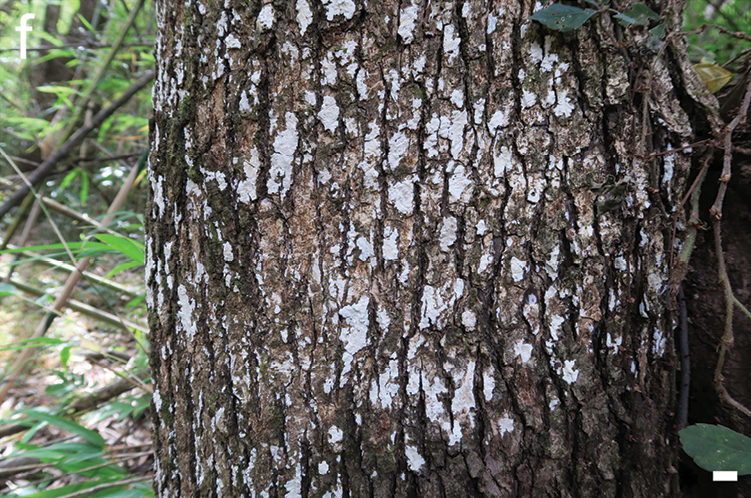
- Tubulicium vermiferum

Scientific classification
- Kingdom: Fungi
- Division: Basidiomycota
- Class: Agaricomycetes
- Order: Trechisporales
- Family: Hydnodontaceae
- Genus: Tubulicium; Oberw. (1965)

Type species
- Tubulicium vermiferum (Bourdot) Oberw. (1965)

Species
- T. dussii T. erectum T. filicicola T. junci-acuti T. macrosporum T. papillatosporum T. ramonense T. vermiculare T. vermiferum

Synonyms
- Tubulixenasma Parmasto (1965)

= Tubulicium =

Genus of fungi

Tubulicium is a genus of fungi in the family Hydnodontaceae. The genus has a widespread distribution, and contains seven species.
