= Fibriciellum =

Scientific classification
- Kingdom: Fungi
- Division: Basidiomycota
- Class: Agaricomycetes
- Order: Trechisporales
- Family: Hydnodontaceae
- Genus: Fibriciellum; J.Erikss. & Ryvarden (1975)

Type species
- Fibriciellum silvae-ryae J.Erikss. & Ryvarden (1975)

Synonyms
- Trechispora silvae-ryae (J.Erikss. & Ryvarden) K.H.Larss. (1992)

Genus of fungi

Fibriciellum is a fungal genus in the family Hydnodontaceae. The genus is monotypic, and contains one corticioid species, Fibriciellum silvae-ryae, found in Europe. The genus and species were described in 1975.
