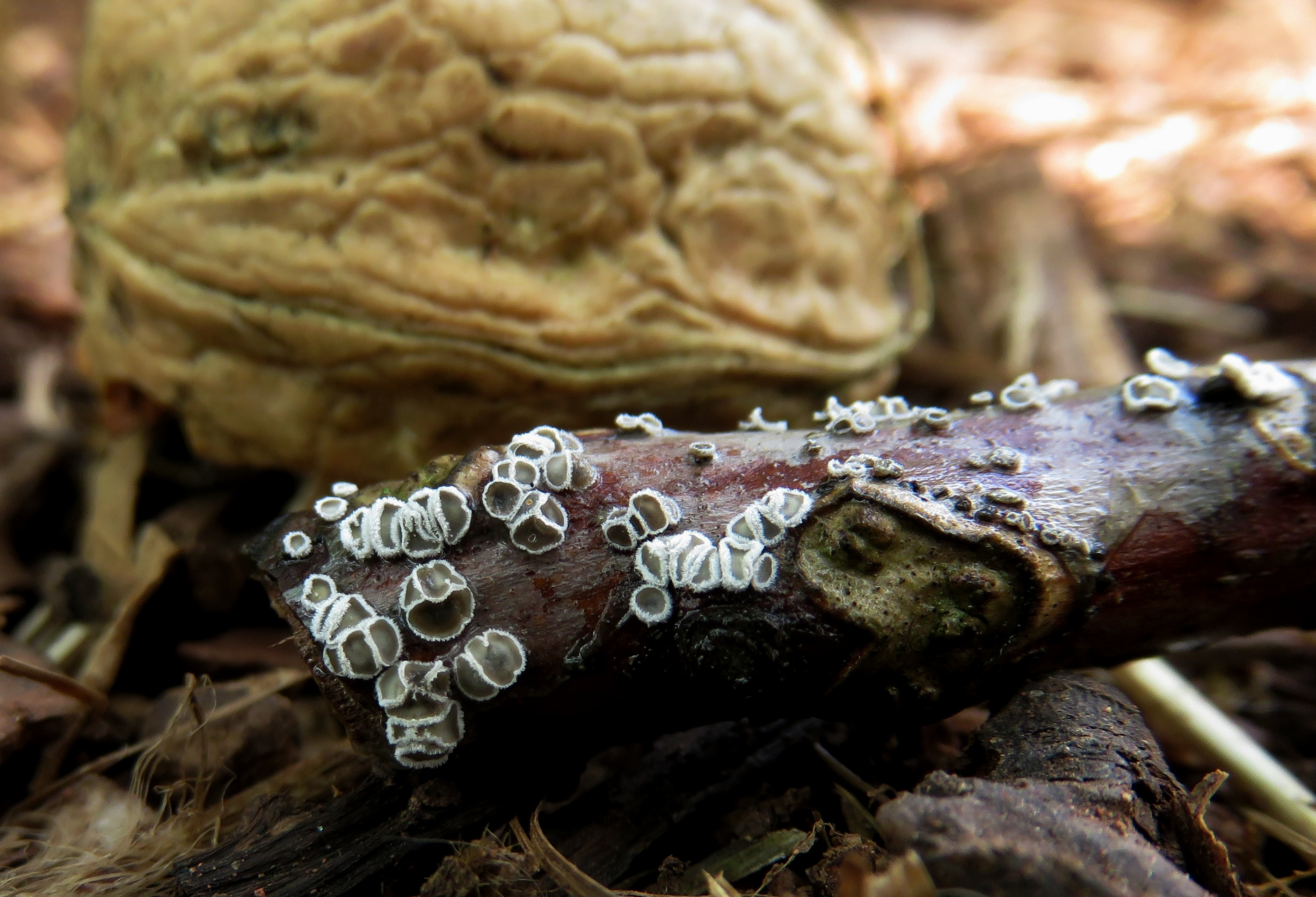
- Lachnella alboviolascens

Scientific classification
- Kingdom: Fungi
- Division: Basidiomycota
- Class: Agaricomycetes
- Order: Agaricales
- Family: Niaceae
- Genus: Lachnella; Fr.

Type species
- Lachnella alboviolascens (Alb. & Schwein.) Fr. (1849)

= Lachnella =

Genus of fungi

Lachnella is a genus of cyphelloid fungi in the Niaceae family. The genus has a widespread distribution and contains six species.

The tiny fruiting bodies (up to about 2 mm across) are cup-shaped or disc-shaped and are densely edged with long white hairs. At most they may have a very short stem, but generally none at all. They can be found all year round on sticks, stalks and sometimes on bark. They are resistant to desiccation, rolling up into a tough closed ball to protect the fertile surface when dry weather comes.
