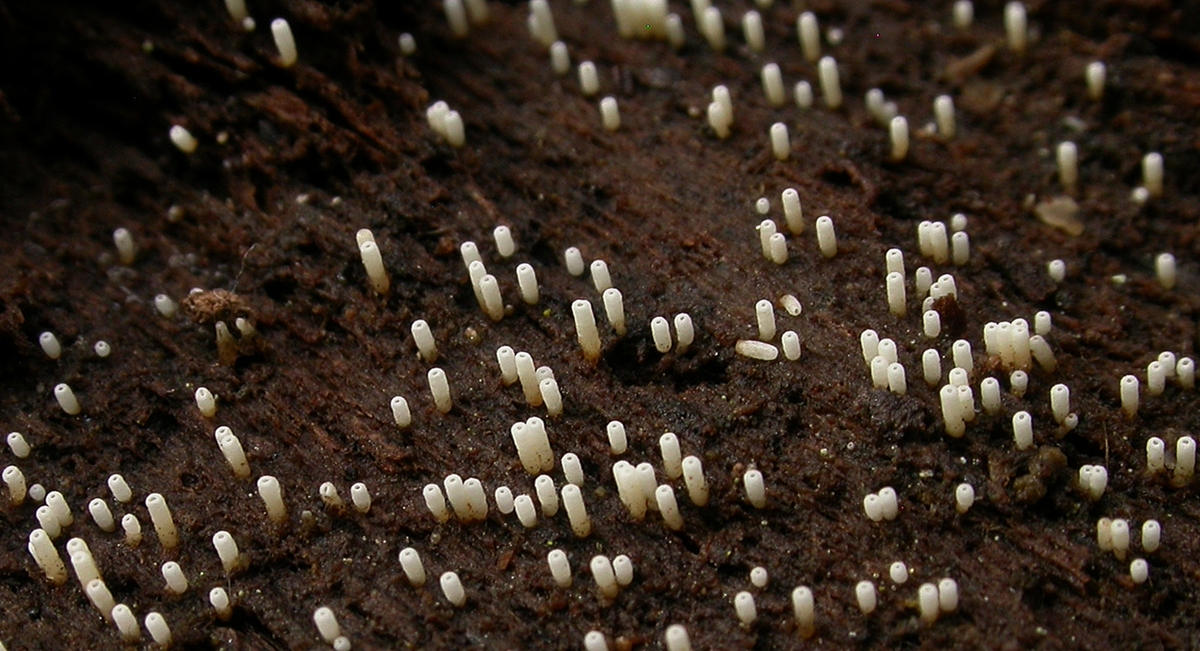
- Henningsomyces candidus

Scientific classification
- Kingdom: Fungi
- Division: Basidiomycota
- Class: Agaricomycetes
- Order: Agaricales
- Family: Marasmiaceae
- Genus: Henningsomyces; Kuntze (1898)

Type species
- Henningsomyces candidus (Pers.) Kuntze (1898)

Synonyms
- Solenia Pers. (1794)

= Henningsomyces =

Genus of fungi

Henningsomyces is a genus of fungi in the family Marasmiaceae. Based on the small, tubular structure of its sporulating body it is called a cyphelloid fungi.

The genus name of Henningsomyces is in honour of Paul Christoph Hennings (1841–1908), who was a German mycologist and herbarium curator.

The genus was circumscribed by Carl Ernst Otto Kuntze in Revis. Gen. Pl. vol.3 (issue 3) on page 483 in 1898.

== Species ==
As of June 2015, Index Fungorum lists 10 species in Henningsomyces:

- Henningsomyces candidus
- Henningsomyces leptus
- Henningsomyces mutabilis
- Henningsomyces nigrescens
- Henningsomyces patinaceus
- Henningsomyces puber
- Henningsomyces pulchellus
- Henningsomyces separatus
- Henningsomyces subiculatus
- Henningsomyces tarapotensis
