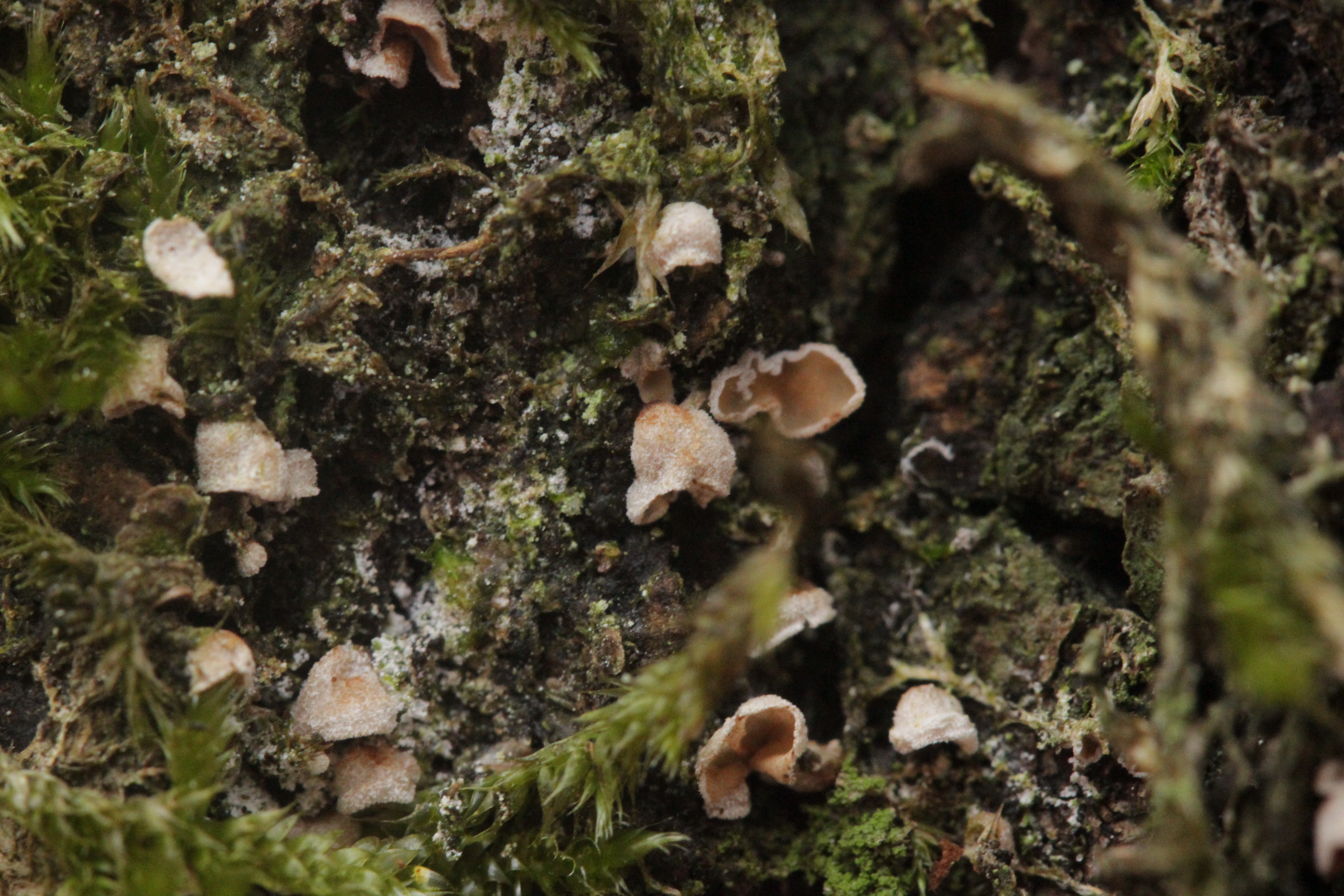
- Chromocyphella muscicola

Scientific classification
- Kingdom: Fungi
- Division: Basidiomycota
- Class: Agaricomycetes
- Order: Agaricales
- Family: Chromocyphellaceae
- Genus: Chromocyphella; De Toni & Levi (1888)

Type species
- Cymbella crouanii Pat. & Doass. (1886)

Species
- C. bryophyticola C. burtii C. galeata C. lamellata C. muscicola C. pinsapinea

= Chromocyphella =

Genus of fungi

Chromocyphella is a genus of fungi in the family Chromocyphellaceae. The genus is widespread and contains six species.
