= Cristelloporia =

Scientific classification
- Kingdom: Fungi
- Division: Basidiomycota
- Class: Agaricomycetes
- Order: Trechisporales
- Family: Hydnodontaceae
- Genus: Cristelloporia; I.Johans. & Ryvarden (1979)

Type species
- Cristelloporia dimitica I.Johans. & Ryvarden (1979)

Species
- C. asperispora C. dimitica C. pahangensis C. rutilantiformis C. trimitica

Genus of fungi

Cristelloporia is a genus of five species of crust fungi in the family Hydnodontaceae. The genus was described by Norwegian mycologists Inger Johansen and Leif Ryvarden in 1979, with Cristelloporia dimitica as the type species.
