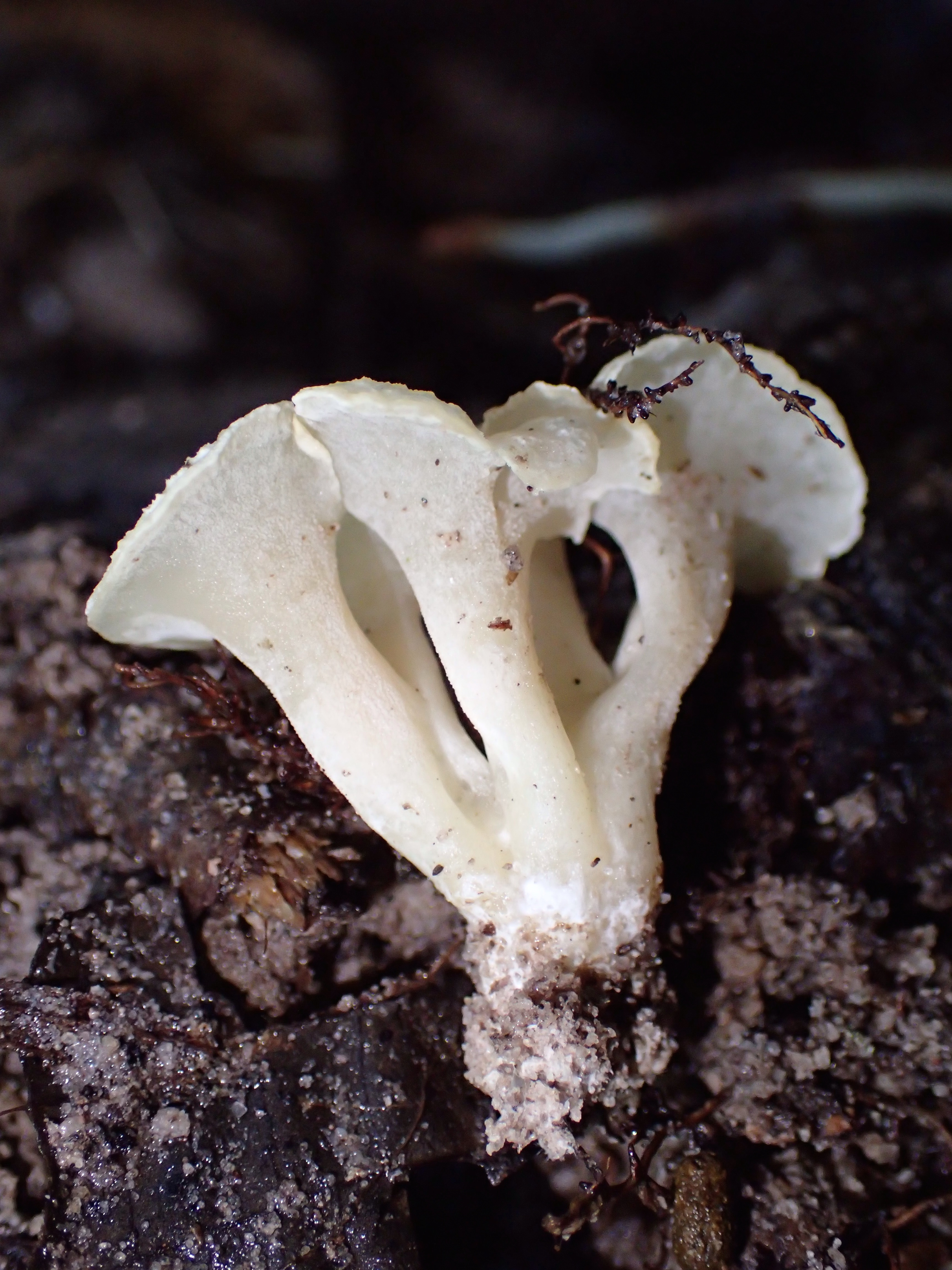
- Hydnodon thelephorus in Amajari, Brazil

Scientific classification
- Kingdom: Fungi
- Division: Basidiomycota
- Class: Agaricomycetes
- Order: Trechisporales
- Family: Hydnodontaceae
- Genus: Hydnodon; Banker (1913)

Type species
- Hydnodon thelephorus (Lév.) Banker (1913)

Synonyms
- Pseudohydnum Rick (1904)

= Hydnodon =

Genus of fungi

Hydnodon is a fungal genus in the family Hydnodontaceae. A monotypic genus. It contains the single species Hydnodon thelephorus, transferred to Hydnodon by Howard James Banker in 1913.
