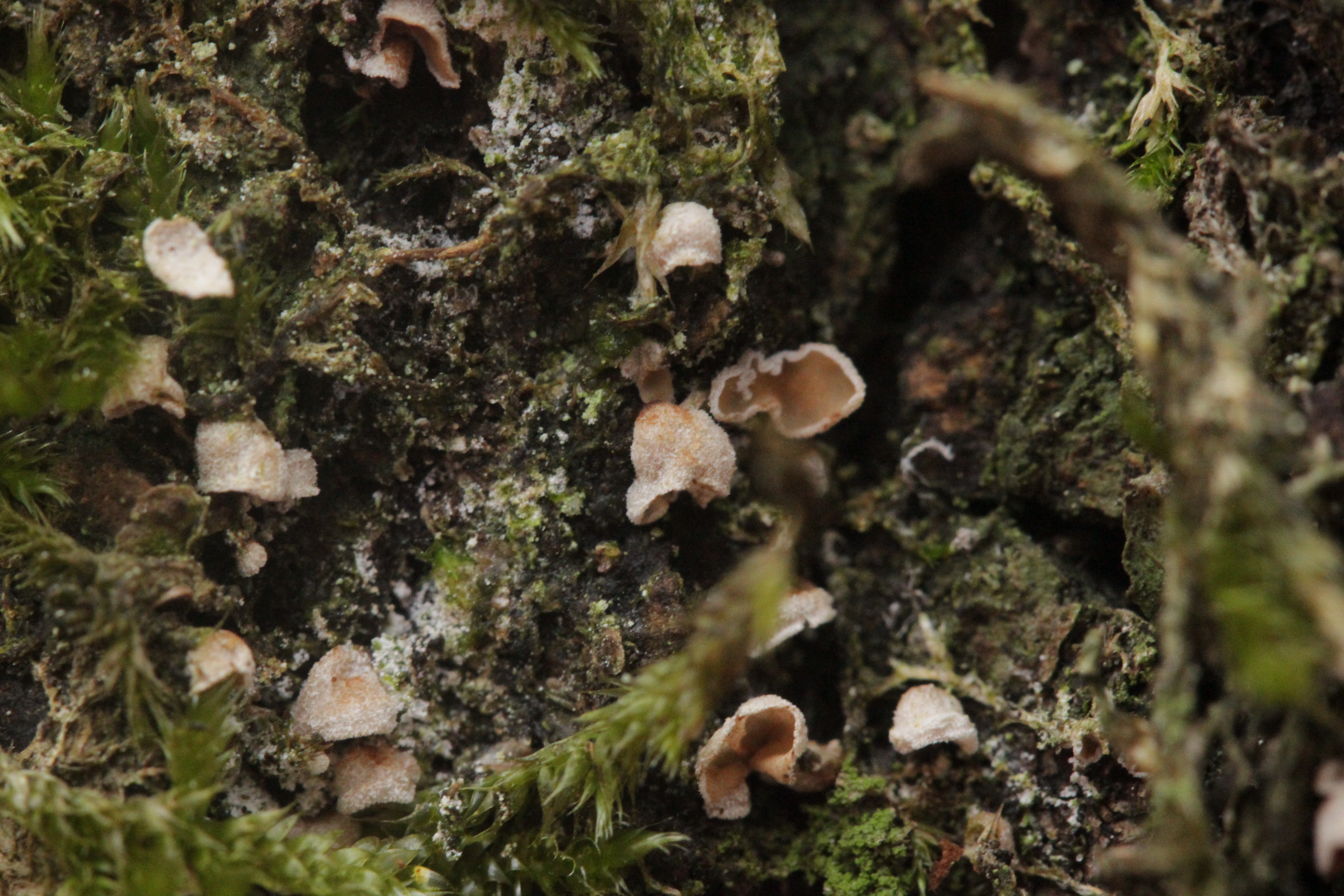
- Chromocyphella muscicola

Scientific classification
- Kingdom: Fungi
- Division: Basidiomycota
- Class: Agaricomycetes
- Order: Agaricales
- Family: Chromocyphellaceae; Knudsen (2010)

Type genus
- Chromocyphella De Toni & Levi (1888)

Genera
- Chromocyphella; Phaeosolenia

= Chromocyphellaceae =

Family of fungi

The Chromocyphellaceae are a family of basidiomycete fungi described by mycologist Henning Knudsen in 2010.

== Taxonomy ==
The family comprises the two genera Chromocyphella and Phaeosolenia, which previously belonged to the Inocybaceae, based on molecular evidence.

== Morphology ==
Characteristic features of the family includes cyphelloid fruitbodies and brown, smooth or verrucose spores with germ pores or some callus formation.
