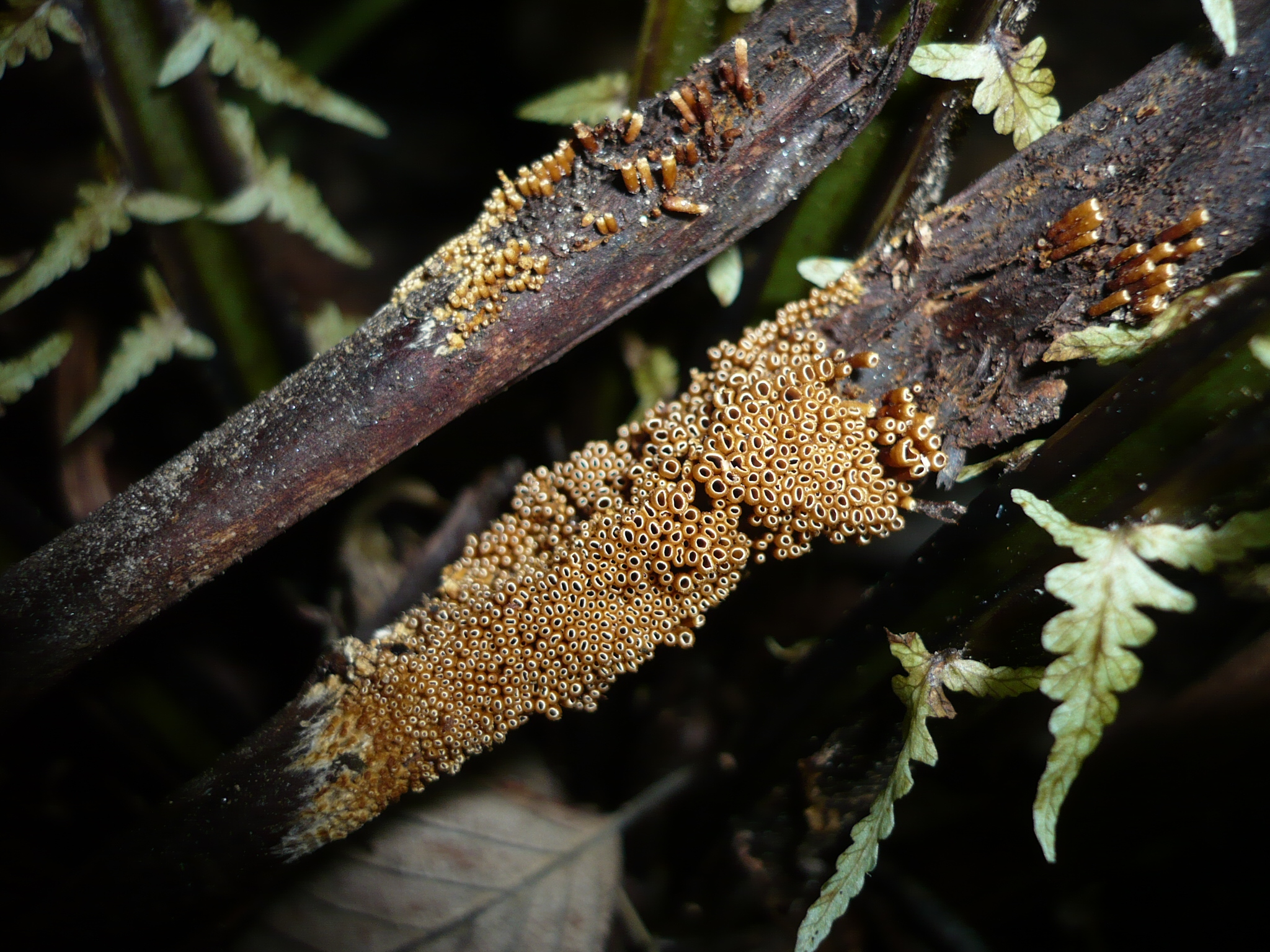

Scientific classification
- Kingdom: Fungi
- Division: Basidiomycota
- Class: Agaricomycetes
- Order: Agaricales
- Family: Niaceae
- Genus: Woldmaria; W.B.Cooke (1961)
- Species: W. filicina

Binomial name
- Woldmaria filicina (Peck) Knudsen (1996)

Synonyms
- Solenia filicina Peck (1876); Solenia crocea P.Karst. (1884); Henningsomyces croceus (P.Karst.) Kuntze (1898); Henningsomyces filicinus (Peck) Kuntze (1898); Woldmaria crocea (P.Karst.) W.B.Cooke (1961)

= Woldmaria =

Genus of fungi

Woldmaria is a fungal genus in the family Niaceae. The genus is monotypic, containing the single species Woldmaria filicina, found in Europe and North America. Woldmaria was described by William Bridge Cooke in 1961, with Woldmaria crocea as the type species; it was subsequently moved into synonymy with W. filicina. It is a species linked only to the fern Matteuccia struthiopteris, having basidiomes constituted by numerous brownish tubules growing at the base of the host plant.

== See also ==
- List of Agaricales genera
