= Dextrinodontia =

Scientific classification
- Kingdom: Fungi
- Division: Basidiomycota
- Class: Agaricomycetes
- Order: Trechisporales
- Family: Hydnodontaceae
- Genus: Dextrinodontia; Hjortstam & Ryvarden (1980)

Type species
- Dextrinodontia molliuscula (Hjortstam & Ryvarden) K.H.Larss. (1980)

Genus of fungi

Dextrinodontia is a fungal genus in the family Hydnodontaceae. The genus is monotypic, containing the single species Dextrinodontia molliuscula, found in Tanzania.
