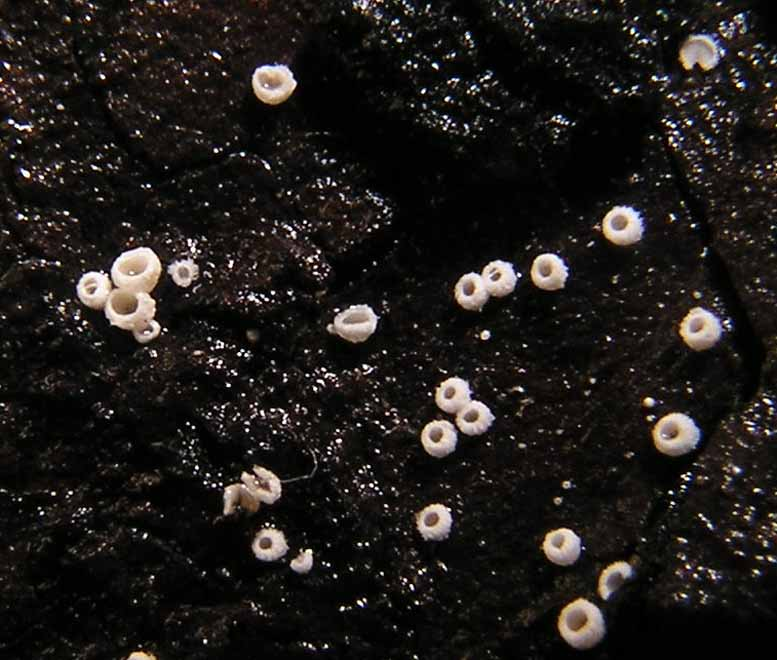
- Flagelloscypha minutissima

Scientific classification
- Domain: Eukaryota
- Kingdom: Fungi
- Division: Basidiomycota
- Class: Agaricomycetes
- Order: Agaricales
- Family: Niaceae
- Genus: Flagelloscypha; Donk (1951)

Type species
- Flagelloscypha minutissima (Burt) Donk (1951)

Synonyms
- Calathella D.A.Reid (1964)

= Flagelloscypha =

Genus of fungi

Flagelloscypha is a genus of cyphelloid fungi in the family Niaceae. The genus has a widespread distribution and contains an estimated 25 species.

== Species ==
- F. abieticol
- F. abruptiflagellata
- F. aotearoa
- F. christinae
- F. citrispora
- F. coloradensis
- F. crassipilata
- F. dextrinoidea
- F. donkii
- F. faginea
- F. flagellata
- F. fusispora
- F. globosa
- F. japonica
- F. kavinae
- F. lachneoides
- F. libertiana
- F. mairei (Pilát) Knudsen
- F. malmei
- F. merxmuelleri
- F. minutissima
- F. montis-anagae
- F. oblongispora
- F. obovatispora
- F. orthospora
- F. parasitica
- F. pilatii
- F. polylepidis
- F. pseudopanacis
- F. pseudopanax
- F. punctiformis
- F. solenioides
- F. subnuda
- F. tetraedrispora
- F. tongariro
- F. trachychaeta
- F. venezuelae
- F. virginea

== See also ==
- List of Agaricales genera
