= Phaeosolenia =

Scientific classification
- Kingdom: Fungi
- Division: Basidiomycota
- Class: Agaricomycetes
- Order: Agaricales
- Family: Chromocyphellaceae
- Genus: Phaeosolenia; Speg. (1902)

Type species
- Phaeosolenia platensis Speg. (1902)

Species
- P. betulae P. brenckleana P. granulosa P. inconspicua P. ochropilosa P. pelargonii P. platensis P. ravenelii

Genus of fungi

Phaeosolenia is a genus of fungi in the family Chromocyphellaceae. The genus contain eight species from South America.

== See also ==
- List of Agaricales genera
