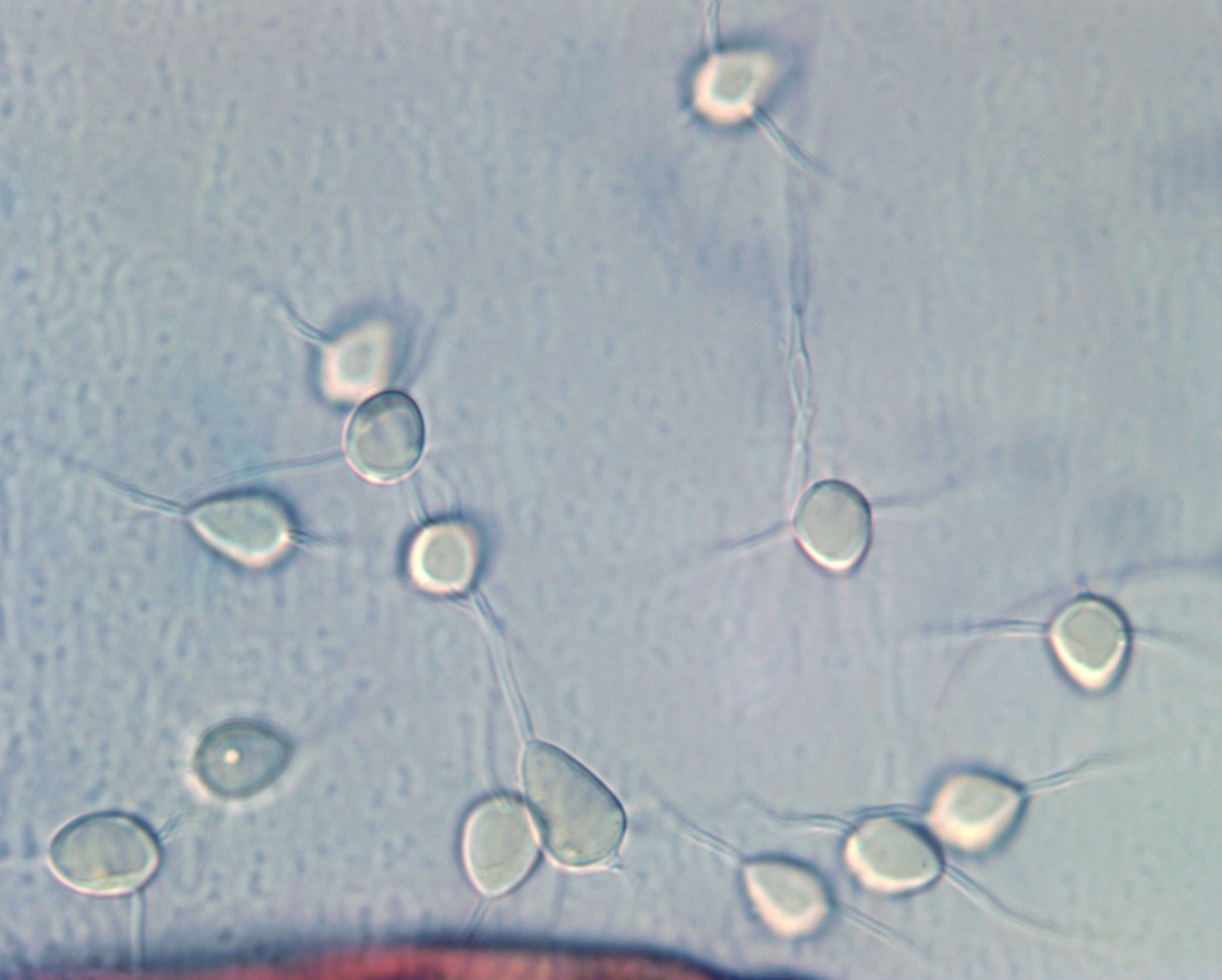
- Nia vibrissa

Scientific classification
- Kingdom: Fungi
- Division: Basidiomycota
- Class: Agaricomycetes
- Order: Agaricales
- Family: Niaceae
- Genus: Nia; R.T. Moore & Meyers

Type species
- Nia vibrissa R.T. Moore & Meyers

Other species
- Nia epidermoidea; Nia globispora

= Nia (fungus) =

Genus of fungi

Nia is a genus of fungi in the family Niaceae. The genus contains three species adapted to a marine environment. All are wood-rotting fungi, producing small, gasteroid basidiocarps (fruit bodies) on driftwood, submerged timber, mangrove wood, and similar substrates. The type species, Nia vibrissa, is widespread in temperate and tropical seas.
