= Digitatispora =

Scientific classification
- Kingdom: Fungi
- Division: Basidiomycota
- Class: Agaricomycetes
- Order: Agaricales
- Family: Niaceae
- Genus: Digitatispora; Doguet (1962)

Type species
- Digitatispora marina Doguet (1962)

Species
- D. lignicola; D. marina

Genus of fungi

Digitatispora is a genus of crustlike marine fungi. While previously placed in the order Atheliales, molecular studies have concluded that Digitatispora belongs in the Agaricales, within the family Niaceae. The genus, circumscribed by French mycologist Gaston Doguet in 1962, contains two wood-decaying species that grow on marine-submerged wood.
