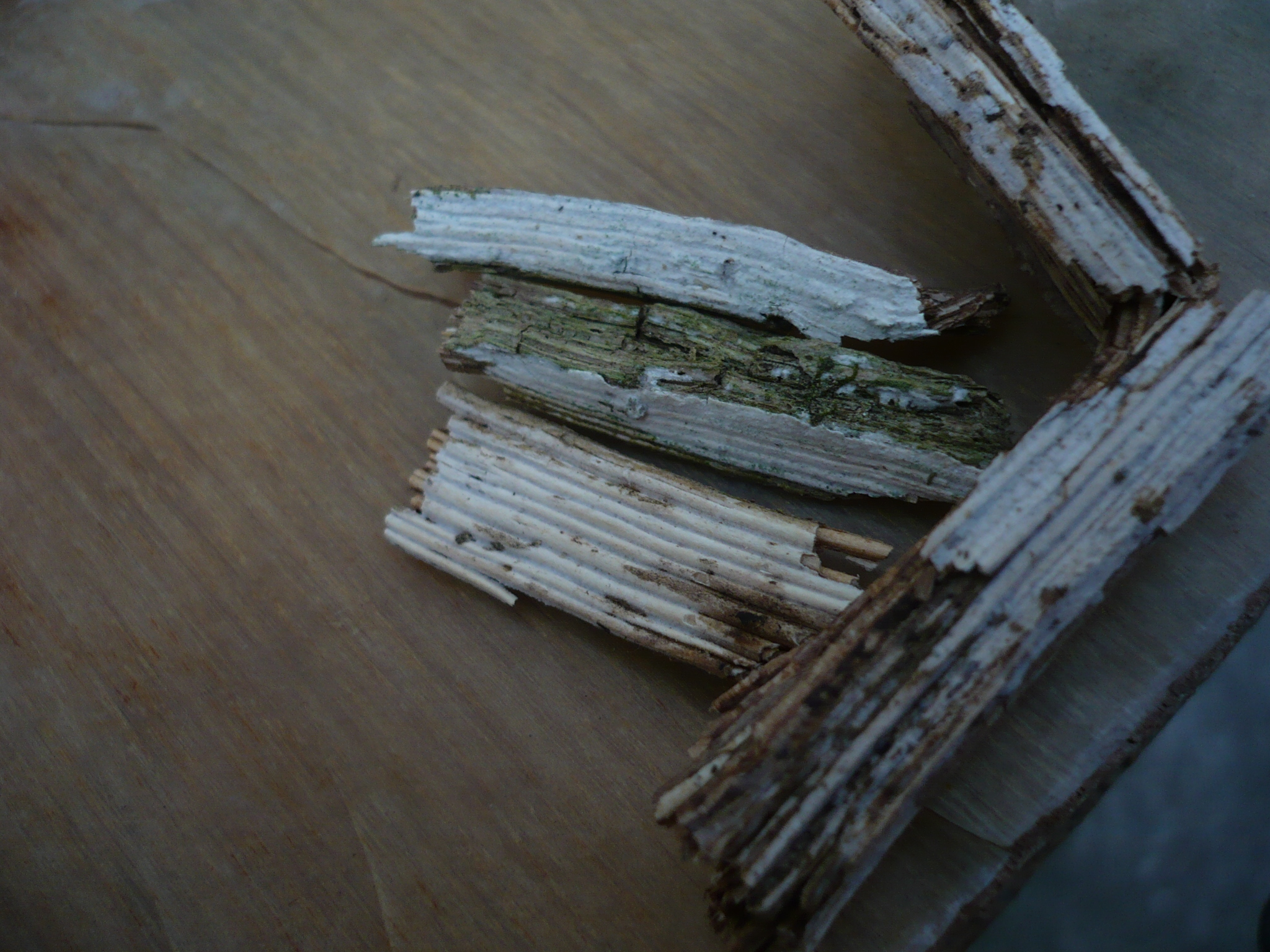
- Litschauerella clematitis

Scientific classification
- Kingdom: Fungi
- Division: Basidiomycota
- Class: Agaricomycetes
- Order: Trechisporales
- Family: Hydnodontaceae
- Genus: Litschauerella; Oberw. (1965)

Type species
- Litschauerella abietis (Bourdot & Galzin) Oberw. ex Jülich (1979)

Species
- Litschauerella abietis Litschauerella clematitis Litschauerella gladiola Litschauerella hastata

= Litschauerella =

Genus of fungi

Litschauerella is a genus of corticioid fungi in the family Hydnodontaceae. The widely distributed genus contains four species. The genus was described by German mycologist Franz Oberwinkler in 1965. The name commemorates Austrian mycologist Viktor Litschauer (1879–1939).
