= Sphaerobasidium =

Scientific classification
- Kingdom: Fungi
- Division: Basidiomycota
- Class: Agaricomycetes
- Order: Trechisporales
- Family: Hydnodontaceae
- Genus: Sphaerobasidium; Oberw. (1965)

Type species
- Sphaerobasidium minutum J.Erikss. (1966)

Species
- S. gloeocystidiatum S. minutum S. subinvisibile

Genus of fungi

Sphaerobasidium is a genus of corticioid fungi in the family Hydnodontaceae. The widely distributed genus contains four species.
