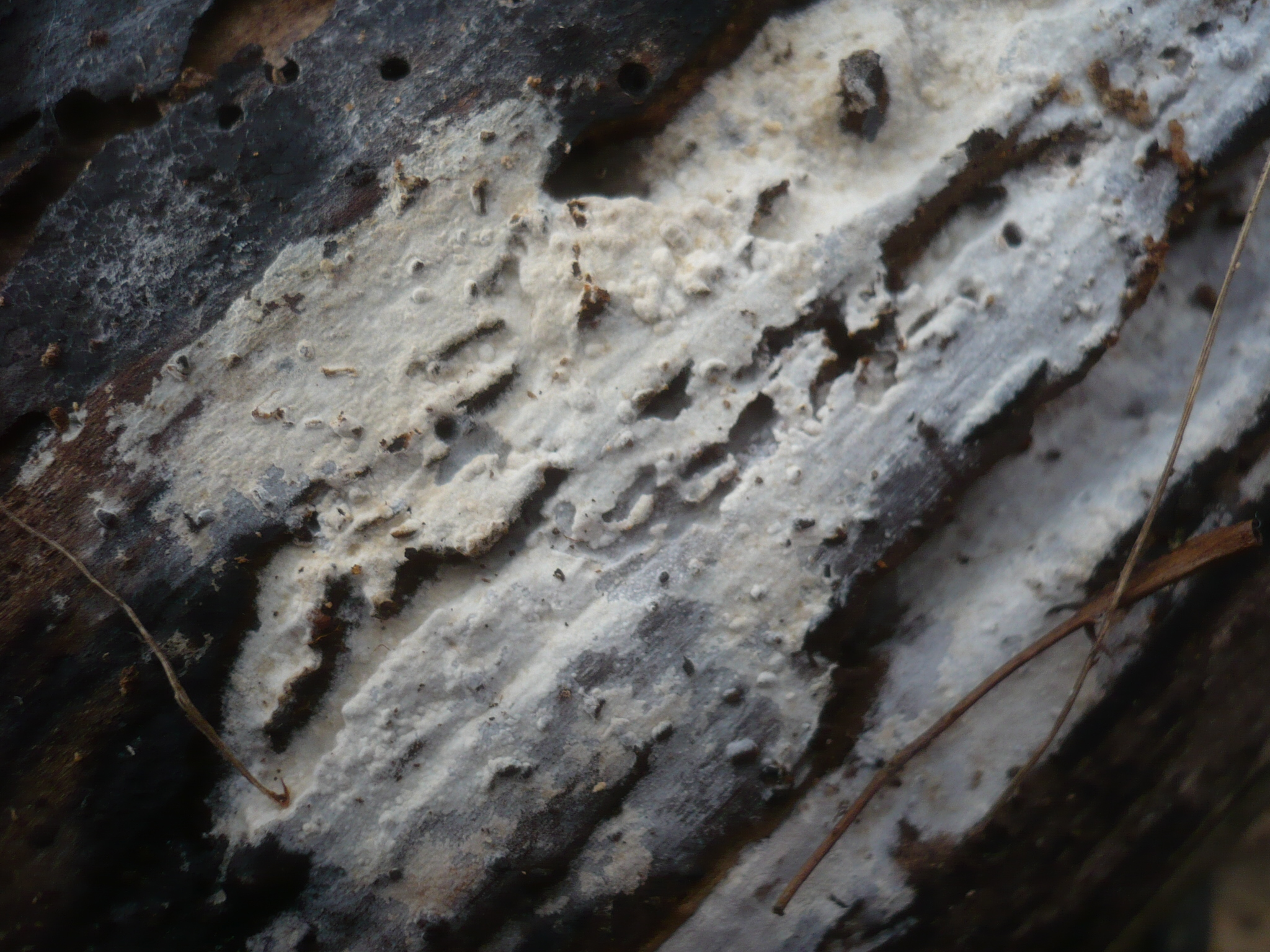
- Subulicystidium longisporum

Scientific classification
- Kingdom: Fungi
- Division: Basidiomycota
- Class: Agaricomycetes
- Order: Trechisporales
- Family: Hydnodontaceae
- Genus: Subulicystidium; Parmasto (1968)

Type species
- Subulicystidium longisporum (Pat.) Parmasto (1968)

Species
- Subulicystidium brachysporum Subulicystidium cochleum Subulicystidium longisporum Subulicystidium meridense Subulicystidium naviculatum Subulicystidium nikau Subulicystidium perlongisporum

= Subulicystidium =

Genus of fungi

Subulicystidium is a genus of corticioid fungi in the family Hydnodontaceae. The genus has a widespread distribution, and contains seven species.
