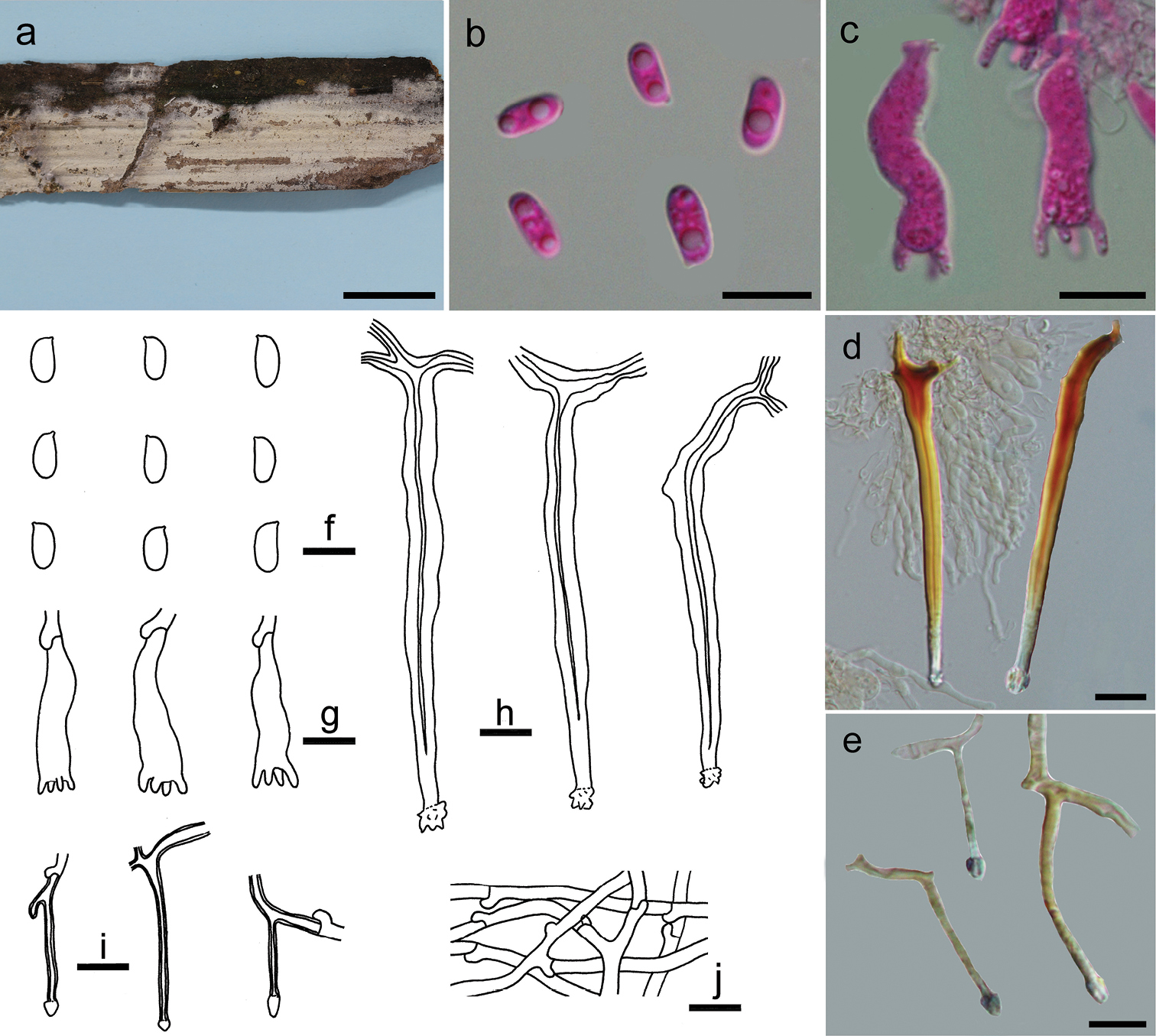
- Dextrinocystis calamicola holotype. a basidiomata b, f basidiospores c, g basidia d, h cystidia e, i cystidia-like branches in subiculum j subicular hyphae. Scale bars: 1 cm (a), 10 µm (b–j). b, c Taken in phloxine d, e taken in Melzer's reagent

Scientific classification
- Kingdom: Fungi
- Division: Basidiomycota
- Class: Agaricomycetes
- Order: Trechisporales
- Family: Hydnodontaceae
- Genus: Dextrinocystis; Gilb. & M.Blackw. (1988)

Type species
- Dextrinocystis capitata (D.P.Rogers & Boquiren) Gilb. & M.Blackw. (1988)

= Dextrinocystis =

Genus of fungi

Dextrinocystis is a fungal genus in the family Hydnodontaceae. The genus contains the white rot species Dextrinocystis capitata, found in the Gulf Coast region of the United States.
