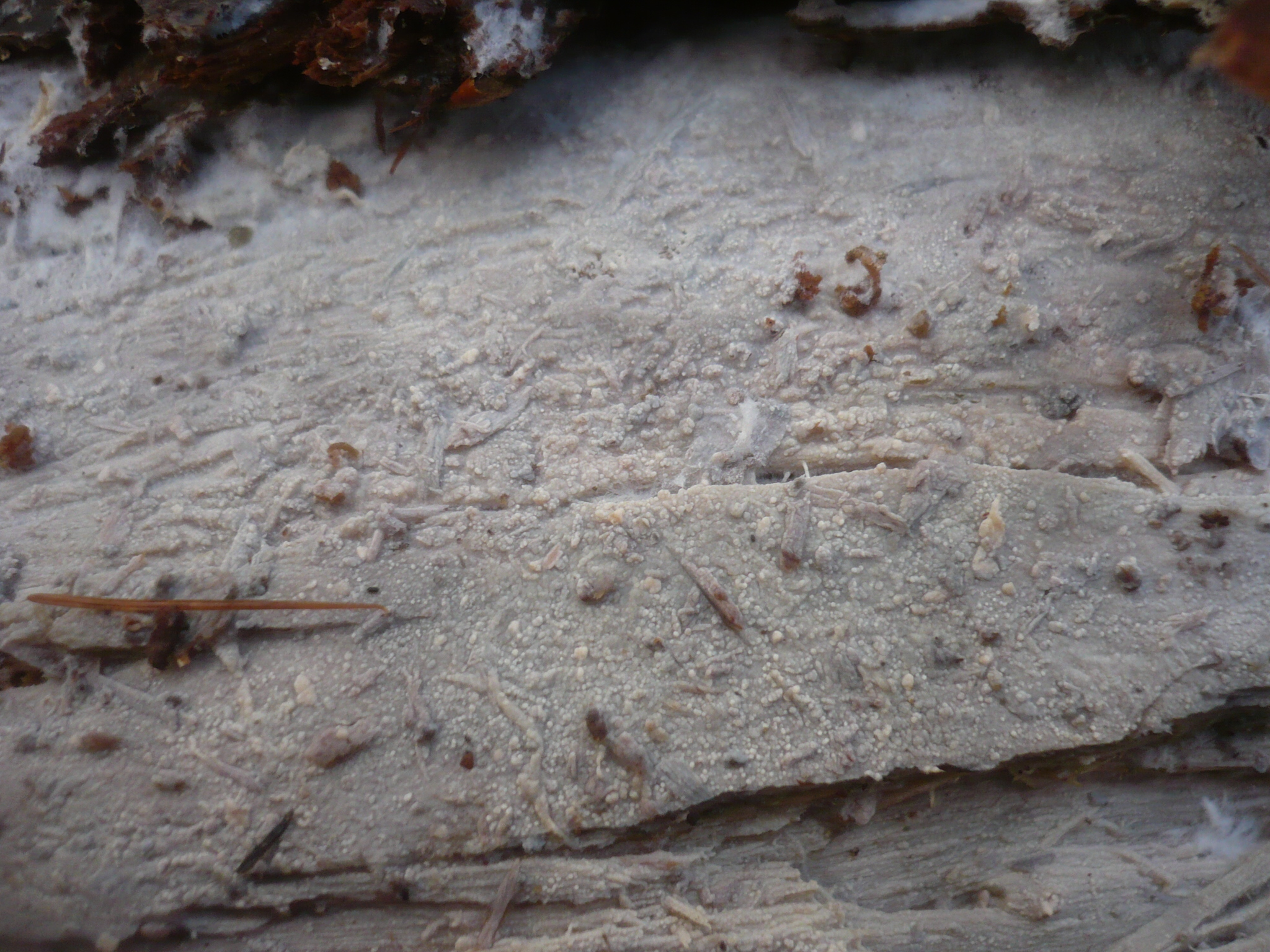
- Sistotremastrum niveocremeum

Scientific classification
- Kingdom: Fungi
- Division: Basidiomycota
- Class: Agaricomycetes
- Order: Trechisporales
- Family: Hydnodontaceae
- Genus: Sistotremastrum; J.Erikss. (1958)

Type species
- Sistotremastrum suecicum Litsch. ex J.Erikss. (1958)

Species
- Sistotremastrum guttuliferum Sistotremastrum lateclavigerum Sistotremastrum niveocremeum Sistotremastrum suecicum

= Sistotremastrum =

Genus of fungi

Sistotremastrum is a genus of crust fungi in the Hydnodontaceae family. The genus has a widespread distribution, and contains four species. Sistotremastrum was defined by Swedish mycologist John Eriksson in 1958.
