= Viktor Litschauer =

Austrian mycologist (1879-1939)

Viktor Litschauer (1879 – 27 December 1939 in Innsbruck) was an Austrian mycologist.

From 1899 to 1903 he studied at the Vienna University of Technology, where he was a pupil and assistant to Franz Xaver Rudolf von Höhnel. For several years he served as a lecturer at the Vienna Gewerbemuseum, then from 1908 to 1936 he was a professor of natural history at the Innsbruck Handelsakademie (academy of commerce). From 1931 to 1933 he edited the exsiccata Fungi selecti exsiccati Europaei with Heinrich Lohwag. Two other exsiccata-like series were curated by him later on, one issued by him and Lohwag.

The mycological genera Litschauerella (Oberw., 1966) and Litschaueria (Petr., 1923) commemorate his name.

== Bibliography ==
- "Revision der Corticieen in Dr J. Schröter’s ‘Pilze Schlesiens’ nach seinen Herbarexemplaren". Annales Mycologici 4 (3): 288-294. (1906, with Franz Xaver Rudolf von Höhnel).
- "Beiträge zur Kenntnis der Corticeen". Sitzungsberichte der Kaiserlichen Akademie der Wissenschaften in Wien Mathematisch-Naturwissenschaftliche Classe, Abt. 1 115 (1): 1549-1620 [reprint pages 1–72], 10 figs. (1906, with Franz Xaver Rudolf von Höhnel).
- "Beiträge zur Kenntnis der Corticeen (II. Mitteilung)". Sitzungsberichte der Kaiserlichen Akademie der Wissenschaften in Wien Mathematisch-Naturwissenschaftliche Classe, Abt. 1 116 (1): 739-852 [reprint pages 1–114] 20 figs, 4 plates. (1907, with Franz Xaver Rudolf von Höhnel).
- "Beiträge zur Kenntnis der Corticeen (III Mitteilung)". Sitzungsberichte der Kaiserlichen Akademie der Wissenschaften in Wien Mathematisch-Naturwissenschaftliche Classe, Abt. 1 117: 1081-1124 [reprint pages 1–44], 10 figs. (1908, with Franz Xaver Rudolf von Höhnel).
- "Über eine neue Aleurodiscus-Art". Österreichische botanische Zeitschrift 75: 47-49, 1 fig. (1926).
- "Über Corticium microsporum Karsten, sensu Bourdot et Galzin". Mitteil. Botan. Institut der Technischen Hochschule in Wien 4: 86-94, tab. 1. (1927).
- "Über Stereum ambiquum Peck und Stereum sulcatum Burt. zwei neue Bürger der Hymenomycetenflora Europas". Archiv für Protistenkunde 72: 302-310, 1 fig., tab. 19. (1930)
- "Neue Corticieen aus Österreich". Österreichische botanische Zeitschrift 77 (2): 121-134. (1928).
