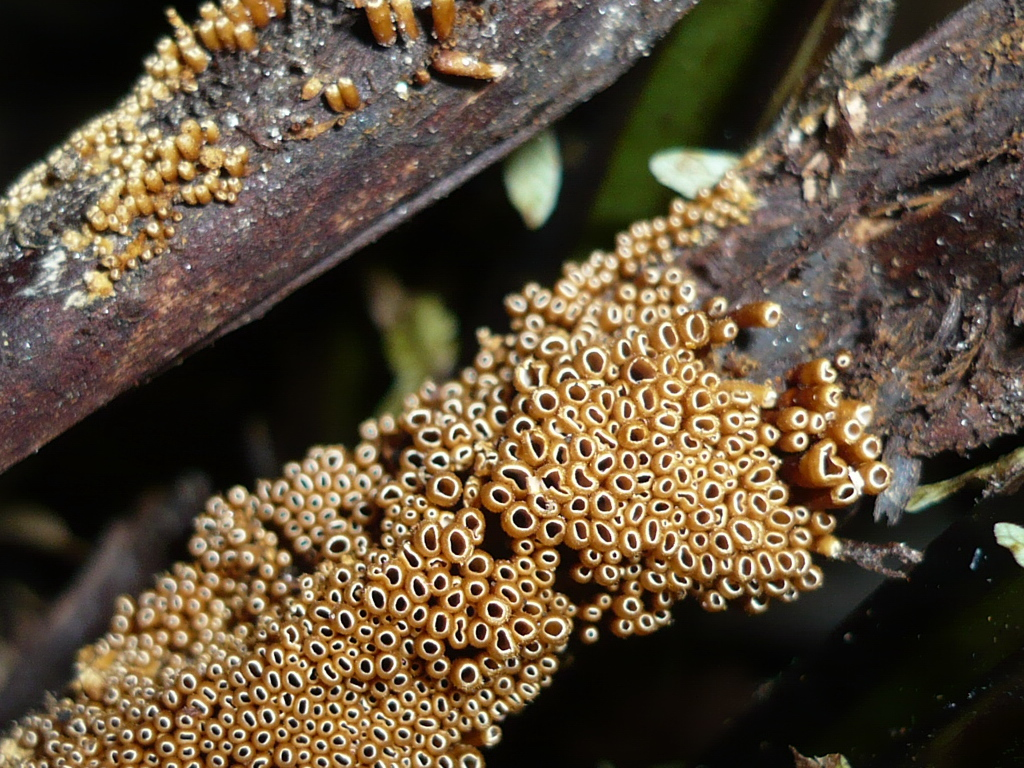
- Woldmaria filicina specimens on fern

Scientific classification
- Kingdom: Fungi
- Division: Basidiomycota
- Class: Agaricomycetes
- Order: Agaricales
- Family: Cyphellopsidaceae; Jülich (1981)

Type genus
- Nia R.T.Moore & Meyers (1961)

Genera
- See text

= Niaceae =

Family of fungi

The Niaceae are a family of fungi in the order Agaricales. The family contains six genera and 56 species. GBIF (in 2022), accepted 10 genera and 278 species.

== Genera ==
- Cyphellopsis Donk, 1931
- Dendrothele
- Digitatispora Doguet, 1962
- Flagelloscypha
- Halocyphina Kohlm. & E.Kohlm., 1965
- Lachnella Fr.
- Maireina W.B.Cooke
- Nia R.T.Moore & Meyers, 1961
- Sphaerobasidioscypha R.Agerer, 1983
- Woldmaria W.B.Cooke (1961)

== Genera formerly included in Niaceae ==
- Merismodes Earle was included in Niaceae, but since 2023 has been placed within the Cyphellopsidaceae family.

== See also ==
- List of Agaricales families
