= Trechispora =

- Trechispora stevensonii

Scientific classification
- Kingdom: Fungi
- Division: Basidiomycota
- Class: Agaricomycetes
- Order: Trechisporales
- Family: Hydnodontaceae
- Genus: Trechispora; P.Karst. (1890)

Type species
- Trechispora onusta P.Karst. (1890)

Synonyms
- Pseudohydnum Rick (1904); Hydnodon Banker (1913); Fibuloporia Bondartsev & Singer ex Singer (1944); Scytinopogon Singer (1945); Echinotrema Park.-Rhodes (1955); Cristelloporia I.Johans. & Ryvarden (1979)

Family of fungi

Trechispora is a genus of fungi in the family Hydnodontaceae. Basidiocarps (fruit bodies) are variously corticioid (effused, patch-forming) or clavarioid (branched and coral-like) with spore-bearing surfaces that are variously smooth to hydnoid or poroid. The genus occurs worldwide, though individual species may be localized. Around 50 species have been described to date.

== Taxonomy ==
Trechispora was introduced in 1890 by Finnish mycologist Petter Karsten to describe a fragile, effused fungus with a poroid hymenium and small, spiny basidiospores. His type and only species, T. onusta, is now known to be a synonym of the earlier name Polyporus hymenocystis (= Trechispora hymenocystis). Additional species with a similar micromorphology have subsequently been added to the genus.

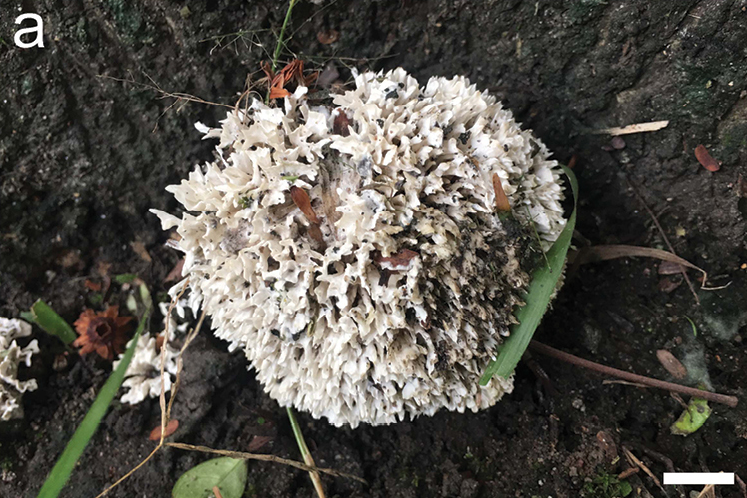
Trechispora pallescens, the type species of Scytinopogon

The genus Scytinopogon was introduced by Rolf Singer in 1945 to accommodate tropical and subtropical fungi with clavarioid basidiocarps having flattened branches and producing small, spiny to warty basidiospores. Molecular research, based on cladistic analysis of DNA sequences, has however shown that Scytinopogon species are nested within Trechispora (which they resemble microscopically) and are consequently not a separate genus but are simply Trechispora species with clavarioid basidiocarps.

== Species ==
- Trechispora alnicola
- Trechispora amianthina
- Trechispora antipus
- Trechispora araneosa
- Trechispora bispora
- Trechispora brasiliensis
- Trechispora brassicicola
- Trechispora byssinella
- Trechispora canariensis
- Trechispora candidissima
- Trechispora caucasica
- Trechispora chartacea
- Trechispora clancularis
- Trechispora cohaerens
- Trechispora copiosa
- Trechispora dimitica
- Trechispora donkii
- Trechispora elongata
- Trechispora farinacea
- Trechispora fastidiosa
- Trechispora gelatinosa
- Trechispora gillesii
- Trechispora gloeospora
- Trechispora granulifera
- Trechispora havencampii
- Trechispora hymenocystis
- Trechispora incisa
- Trechispora invisitata
- Trechispora kavinioides
- Trechispora laevis
- Trechispora microspora
- Trechispora minima
- Trechispora minispora
- Trechispora minuta
- Trechispora mollusca
- Trechispora mutabilis
- Trechispora nivea
- Trechispora pallescens
- Trechispora papillosa
- Trechispora petrophila
- Trechispora polygonospora
- Trechispora praefocata
- Trechispora regularis
- Trechispora rigida
- Trechispora sphaerocystis
- Trechispora sphaerospora
- Trechispora stellulata
- Trechispora stevensonii
- Trechispora subhelvetica
- Trechispora subsphaerospora
- Trechispora tenuicula
- Trechispora termitophila
- Trechispora trigonospora
- Trechispora variseptata
- Trechispora verruculosa
