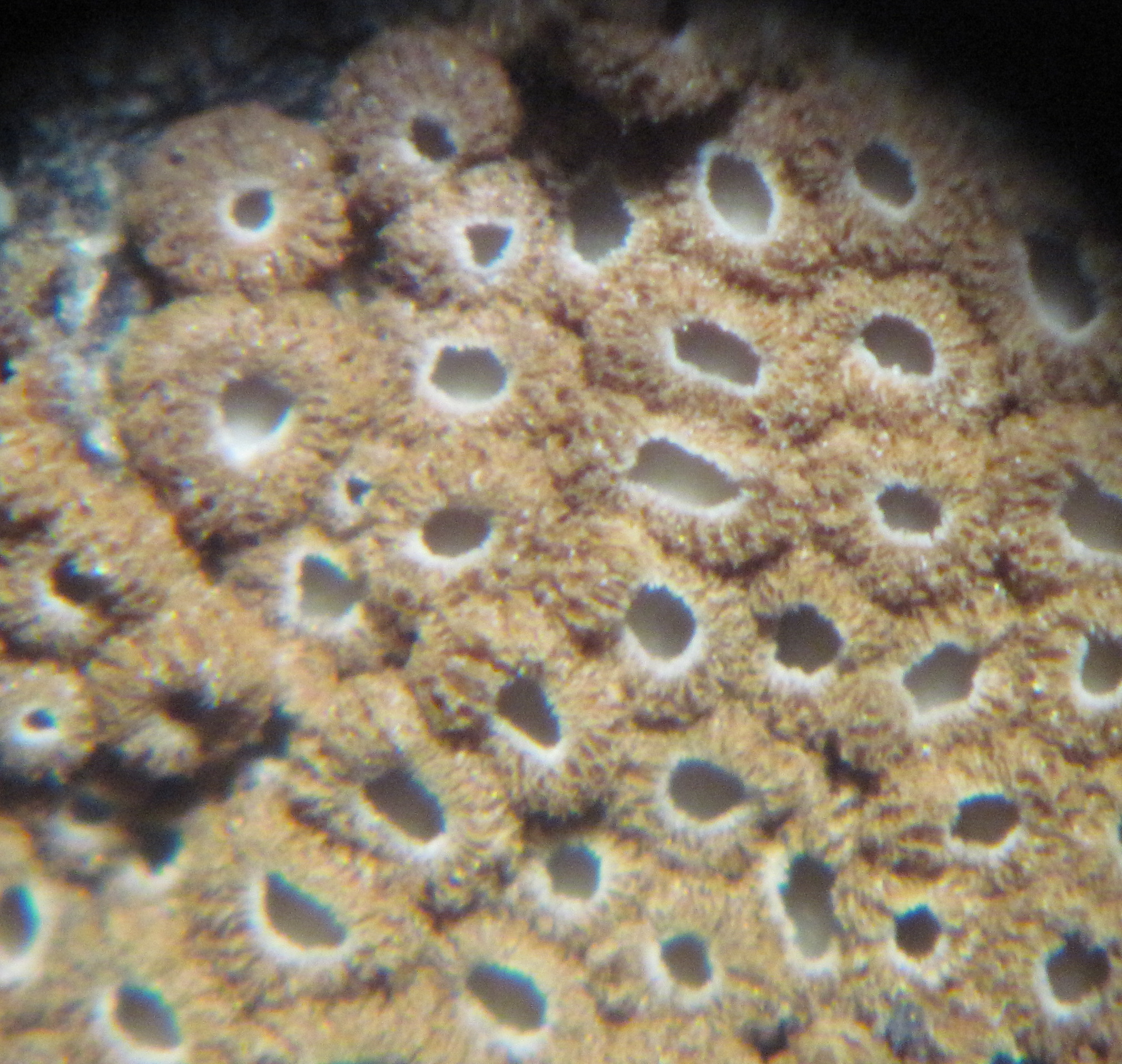
- Merismodes fasciculata

Scientific classification
- Kingdom: Fungi
- Division: Basidiomycota
- Class: Agaricomycetes
- Order: Agaricales
- Family: Cyphellopsidaceae
- Genus: Merismodes; Earle

Type species
- Merismodes fasciculata (Schwein.) Earle

= Merismodes =

Genus of fungi

Merismodes is a genus of fungi in the Cyphellopsidaceae family. It was previously included in the Niaceae family. The genus has a widespread distribution and contains 20 species.
