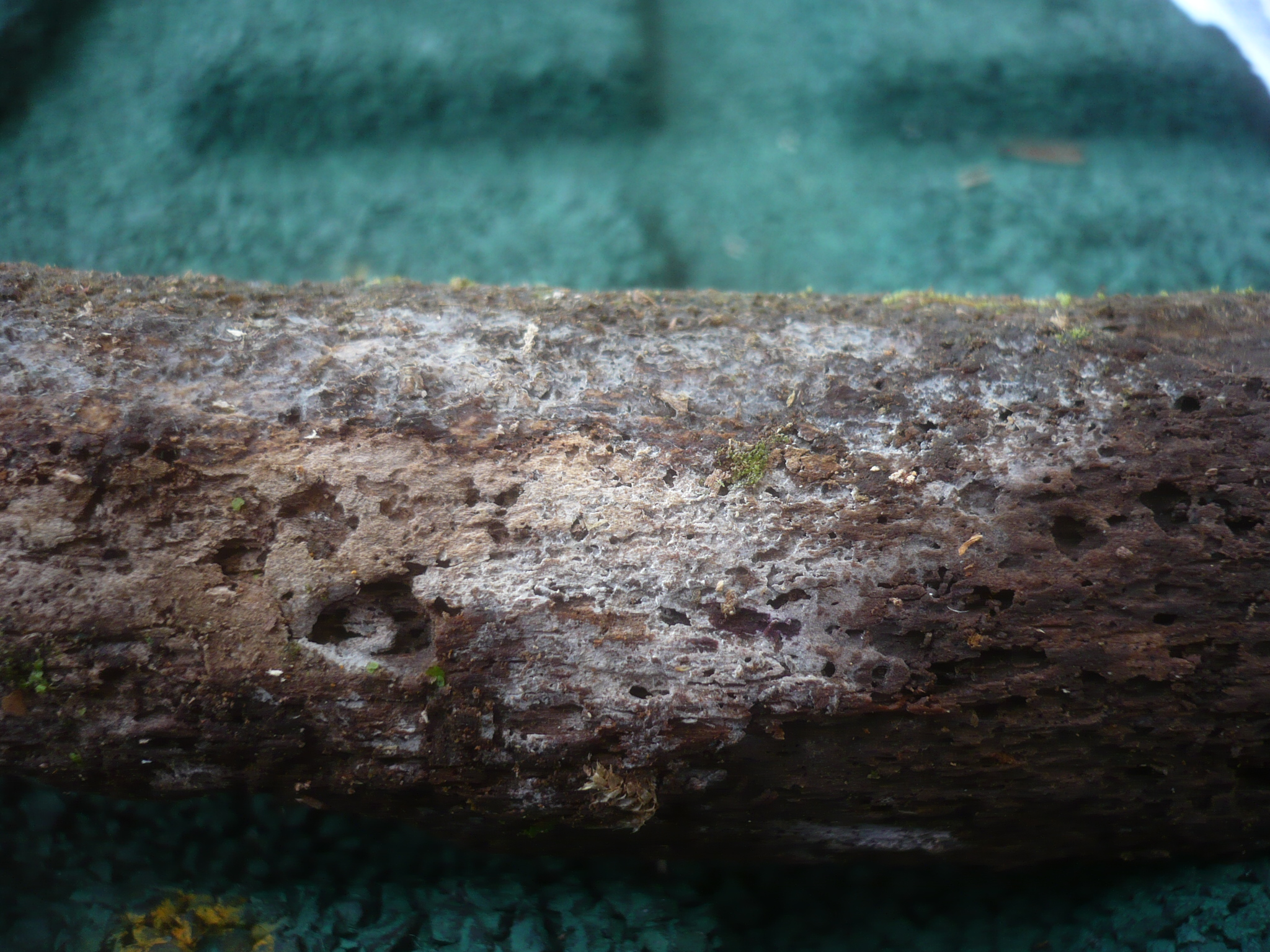
- Sistotremella perpusilla growing on beech

Scientific classification
- Kingdom: Fungi
- Division: Basidiomycota
- Class: Agaricomycetes
- Order: Trechisporales
- Family: Hydnodontaceae
- Genus: Sistotremella; Hjortstam (1984)

Type species
- Sistotremella perpusilla Hjortstam (1984)

Species
- Sistotremella cystidiolophora Sistotremella hauerslevii Sistotremella paullicorticioides Sistotremella perpusilla

= Sistotremella =

Genus of fungi

Sistotremella is a genus of corticioid fungi in the family Hydnodontaceae. The genus has a widespread distribution, and contains four species.
