= Halocyphina =

Scientific classification
- Kingdom: Fungi
- Division: Basidiomycota
- Class: Agaricomycetes
- Order: Agaricales
- Family: Niaceae
- Genus: Halocyphina; Kohlm. & E. Kohlm.

Type species
- Halocyphina villosa Kohlm. & E. Kohlm.

Genus of fungi

Halocyphina is a genus of fungus in the Niaceae family. It is a monotypic genus, containing the single species Halocyphina villosa, a marine fungus found in the USA.
