= Luellia =

Scientific classification
- Kingdom: Fungi
- Division: Basidiomycota
- Class: Agaricomycetes
- Order: Trechisporales
- Family: Hydnodontaceae
- Genus: Luellia; K.H.Larss. & Hjortstam (1974)

Type species
- Luellia recondita (H.S.Jacks.) K.H.Larss. & Hjortstam (1974)

Species
- L. cystidiata L. furcata L. recondita

Genus of fungi

Luellia is a genus of corticioid fungi in the family Hydnodontaceae. The genus contains three species found in Europe and North America.
