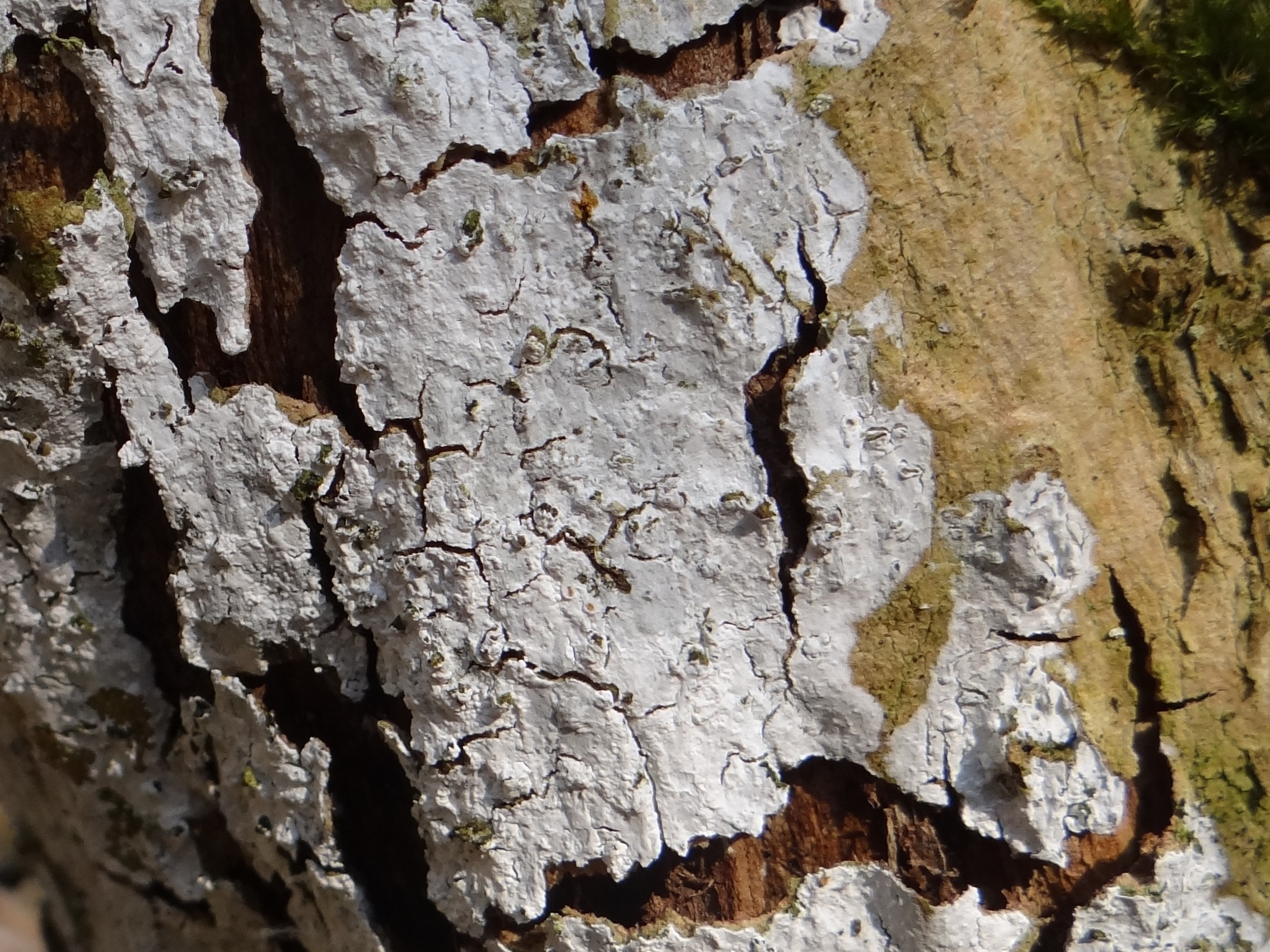
- Dendrothele acerina on Salix sp.

Scientific classification
- Domain: Eukaryota
- Kingdom: Fungi
- Division: Basidiomycota
- Class: Agaricomycetes
- Order: Corticiales
- Family: Corticiaceae
- Genus: Dendrothele; Höhn. & Litsch. (1907)

Type species
- Dendrothele papillosa Höhn. & Litsch. (1907)

= Dendrothele =

Genus of fungi

Dendrothele is a genus of fungi in the family Corticiaceae. According to a 2008 estimate, the genus has 36 widely distributed species.

== Species ==
The following species are recognised in the genus Dendrothele:

- Dendrothele acerina (Pers.) P.A. Lemke (1965)
- Dendrothele alba Viégas (1940)
- Dendrothele alliacea (Quél.) P.A. Lemke (1965)
- Dendrothele americana Nakasone (2006)
- Dendrothele ampullospora (G. Cunn.) Nakasone & Burds. (2011)
- Dendrothele amygdalispora Hjortstam (1987)
- Dendrothele andina (Pat.) Nakasone (2006)
- Dendrothele andinopatagonica Gresl. & Rajchenb. (1998)
- Dendrothele arachispora Nakasone & Burds. (2011)
- Dendrothele asterospora Boidin & Lanq. (1996)
- Dendrothele aucklandica Nakasone & Burds. (2011)
- Dendrothele australis Nakasone & Burds. (2011)
- Dendrothele biapiculata (G. Cunn.) P.A. Lemke (1965)
- Dendrothele bisporigera Pouzar & Kotl. (2010)
- Dendrothele boidinii Gresl. & Rajchenb. (1998)
- Dendrothele candida (Schwein.) P.A. Lemke (1965)
- Dendrothele capitulata Boidin & Lanq. (1996)
- Dendrothele citrisporella Boidin & Duhem (2010)
- Dendrothele commixta (Höhn. & Litsch.) J. Erikss. & Ryvarden (1975)
- Dendrothele corniculata (G. Cunn.) Stalpers (1985)
- Dendrothele cornivesiculosa P. Roberts (2009)
- Dendrothele crustulinum (Bres.) Nakasone (2008)
- Dendrothele cymbiformis Nakasone & Burds. (2011)
- Dendrothele duthiei P.H.B. Talbot (1956)
- Dendrothele gilbertsonii Nakasone (2009)
- Dendrothele griseocana (Bres.) Bourdot & Galzin (1913)
- Dendrothele incrustans (P.A. Lemke) P.A. Lemke (1965)
- Dendrothele itihummensis Gilb. & M. Blackw. (1985)
- Dendrothele jacobi Duhem & H. Michel (2007)
- Dendrothele latenavicularis Gorjón (2011)
- Dendrothele lemkei Gresl. & Rajchenb. (1998)
- Dendrothele lepra (Berk. & Broome) P.A. Lemke (1965)
- Dendrothele leptostachys Nakasone & Burds. (2011)
- Dendrothele macrodens (Coker) P.A. Lemke (1965)
- Dendrothele magninavicularis Nakasone & Burds. (2011)
- Dendrothele mangiferae Boidin & Duhem (1996)
- Dendrothele mexicana (P.A. Lemke) P.A. Lemke (1965)
- Dendrothele microspora (H.S. Jacks. & P.A. Lemke) P.A. Lemke (1965)
- Dendrothele minima Duhem (2007)
- Dendrothele minutissima (Höhn. & Litsch.) Kotir., K.H. Larss. & Saaren. (2011)
- Dendrothele moquiniarum (Viégas) P.A. Lemke (1965)
- Dendrothele nakasoneae Gorjón (2012)
- Dendrothele navicularis Nakasone & Burds. (2011)
- Dendrothele naviculoefibulata Duhem (2013)
- Dendrothele nivosa (Berk. & M.A. Curtis ex Höhn. & Litsch.) P.A. Lemke (1965)
- Dendrothele nivosoides Gaignon, Duc & H. Michel (2001)
- Dendrothele novae-zelandiae Nakasone & Burds. (2011)
- Dendrothele ornata Gorjón (2012)
- Dendrothele pachysterigmata (H.S. Jacks. & P.A. Lemke) P.A. Lemke (1965)
- Dendrothele papillata B. de Vries & Arnolds (2015)
- Dendrothele pitrae Gresl. & Rajchenb. (1998)
- Dendrothele pulvinata (G. Cunn.) P.A. Lemke (1965)
- Dendrothele salicicola Pouzar & Kotl. (2010)
- Dendrothele seriata (Berk. & M.A. Curtis) P.A. Lemke (1965)
- Dendrothele strumosa (Fr.) P.A. Lemke (1965)
- Dendrothele subellipsoidea Nakasone & Burds. (2011)
- Dendrothele syspora C.L.M. Rodrigues & Guerrero (2013)
- Dendrothele tanzaniana Nakasone (2006)
- Dendrothele tetracornis Boidin & Duhem (1996)
- Dendrothele triangulispora (Rick) Baltazar & Rajchenb. (2016)
- Dendrothele tuberculata Gresl. & Rajchenb. (1998)
- Dendrothele wojewodae Pouzar (2001)
