= Stare Rybie =

- Village
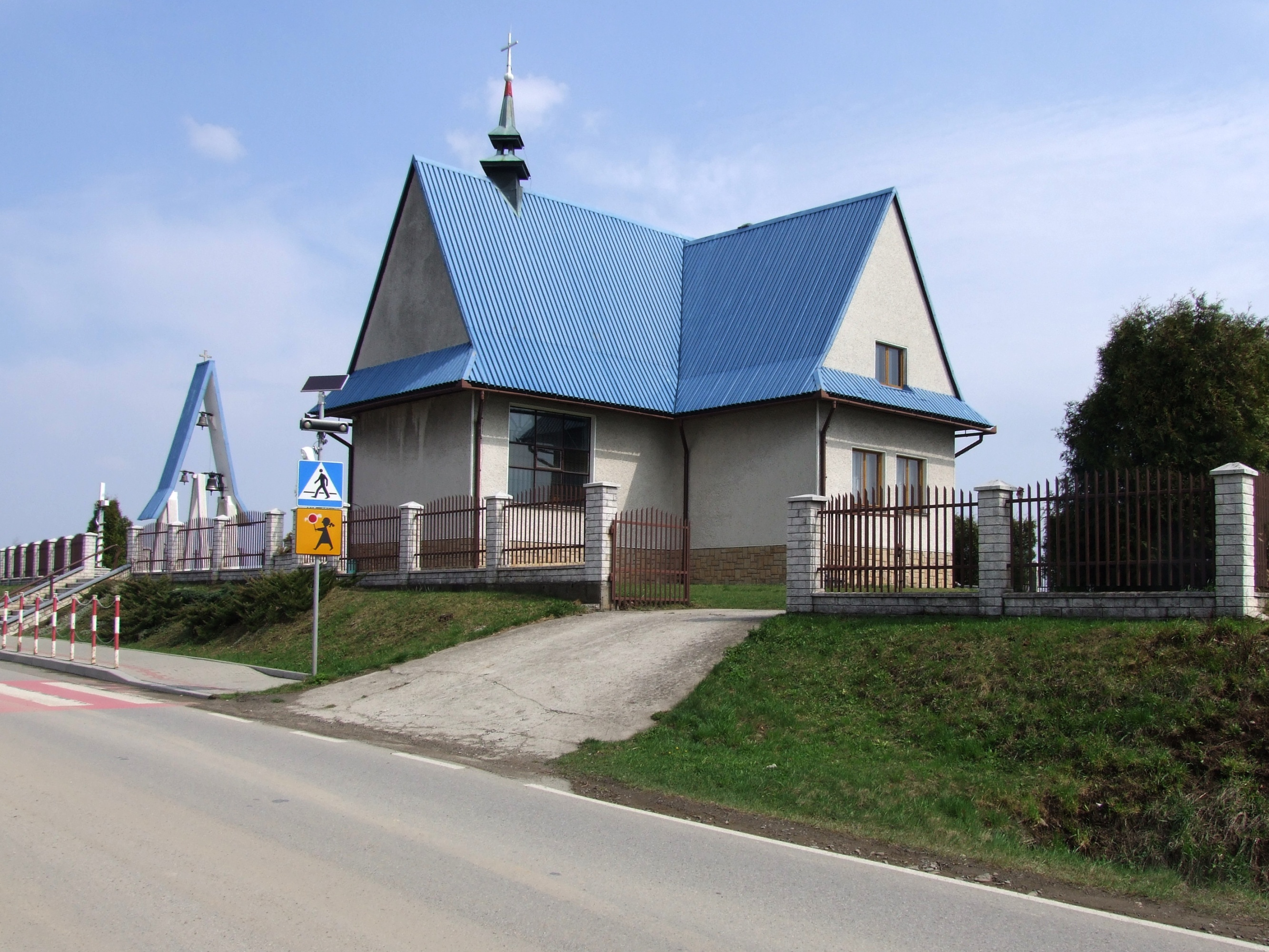
- Local Catholic church

- Location within Poland
- Coordinates: 49°48′21″N 20°18′52″E
- Country: Poland
- Voivodeship: Lesser Poland
- County: Limanowa
- Gmina: Limanowa
- Highest elevation: 430 m (1,410 ft)
- Lowest elevation: 315 m (1,033 ft)
- Population: 332

Stare Rybie [ˈstarɛ ˈrɨbjɛ] is a village in the administrative district of Gmina Limanowa, within Limanowa County, Lesser Poland Voivodeship, in southern Poland.
