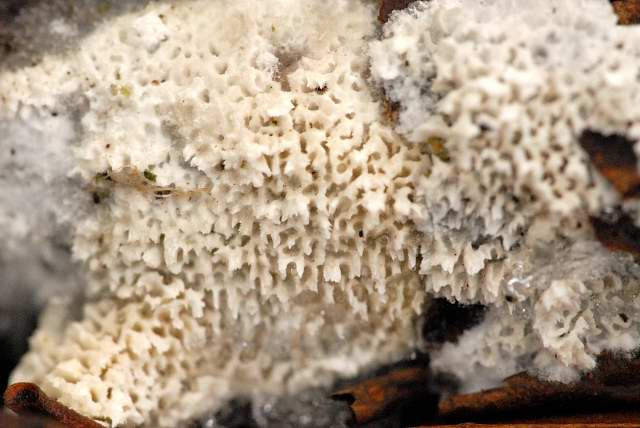
- Trechispora mollusca

Scientific classification
- Kingdom: Fungi
- Division: Basidiomycota
- Class: Agaricomycetes
- Order: Trechisporales; K.H.Larss. (2007)
- Family: Hydnodontaceae; Jülich (1982)

Type genus
- Hydnodon Banker (1913)

Genera
- Boidinella; Brevicellicium; Cristelloporia; Dextrinocystis; Dextrinodontia; Fibriciellum; Hydnodon; Litschauerella; Luellia; Sistotremastrum; Sistotremella; Sphaerobasidium; Subulicystidium; Trechispora; Tubulicium

= Hydnodontaceae =

Family of fungi

The Hydnodontaceae are a family of fungi in the class Agaricomycetes. According to a 2008 estimate, the family contains 15 genera and 105 species. It is the only family in the order Trechisporales.
