= Abrotelina =

Scientific classification
- Kingdom: Animalia
- Phylum: Arthropoda
- Clade: Pancrustacea
- Class: Insecta
- Order: Coleoptera
- Suborder: Polyphaga
- Infraorder: Staphyliniformia
- Family: Staphylinidae
- Subfamily: Aleocharinae
- Tribe: Corotocini
- Subtribe: Abrotelina; Seevers, 1957

Subtribe of beetles

Abrotelina is a subtribe of rove beetles in the tribe Corotocini. It was first described by Seevers in 1957. It contains 20 accepted species split across two genera. The vast majority of recorded observations have been made in Peru.

== Genera ==
- Abroteles
- Termitophya
