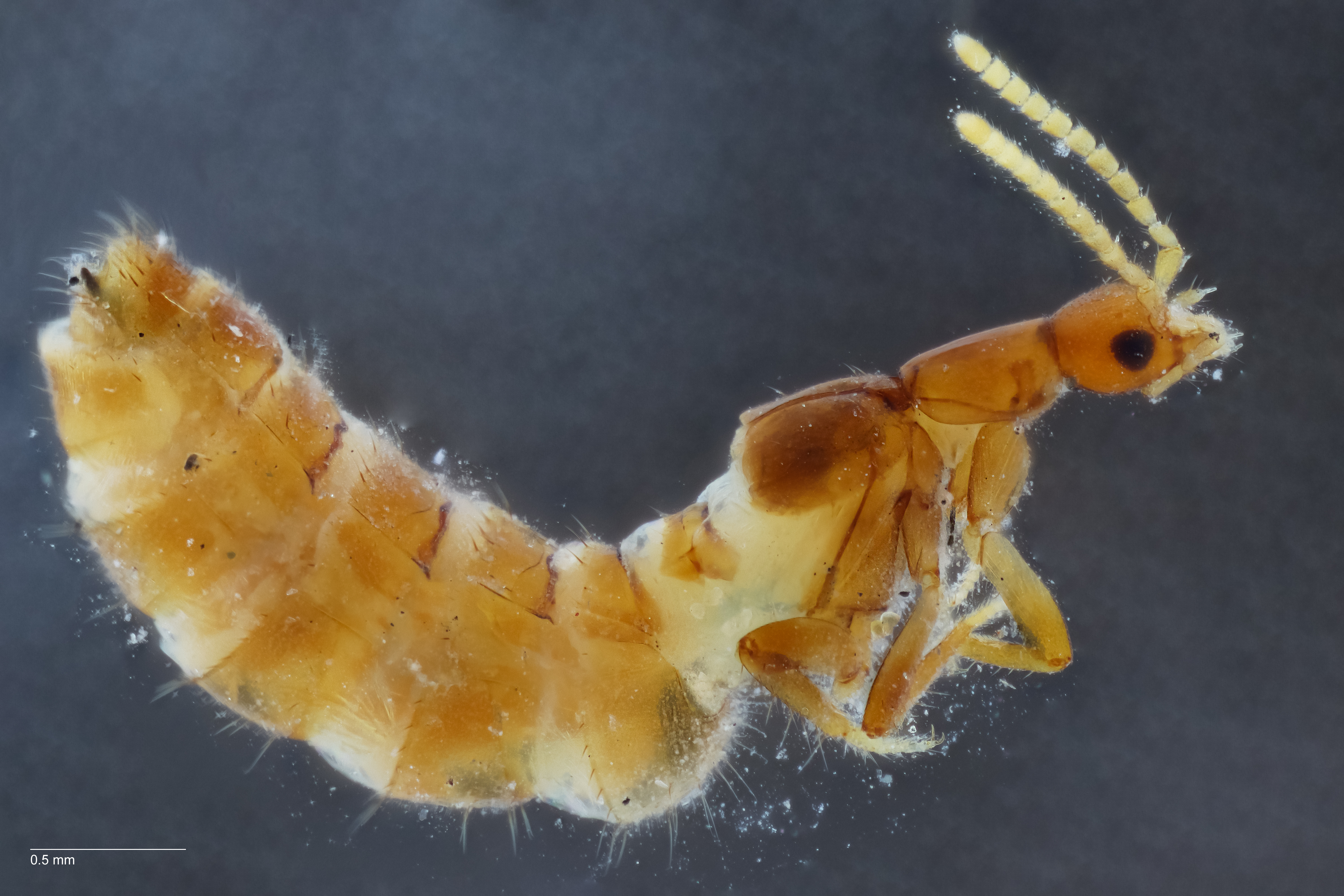
- Termitophya araujoi, lateral view

Scientific classification
- Kingdom: Animalia
- Phylum: Arthropoda
- Clade: Pancrustacea
- Class: Insecta
- Order: Coleoptera
- Suborder: Polyphaga
- Infraorder: Staphyliniformia
- Family: Staphylinidae
- Subfamily: Aleocharinae
- Tribe: Corotocini
- Genus: Termitophya; Wasmann, 1902

= Termitophya =

Genus of beetles

Termitophya is a genus of small termitophilous beetles of the family Staphylinidae ("rove beetles"), belonging to the order Coleoptera. The genus was described by the Austrian entomologist Erich Wasmann in 1902 and currently includes 11 species recorded from the neotropical region, associated to termites of the genera Anoplotermes and Nasutitermes.

== Species ==
The following species are assigned to this genus:

- Termitophya amica Mann, 1923
- Termitophya araujoi Borgmeier, 1950
- Termitophya ecuadoriensis Seevers, 1937
- Termitophya emersoni Seevers, 1937
- Termitophya flaviventris Mann, 1923
- Termitophya heyeri Wasmann, 1902
- Termitophya holmgreni Wasmann, 1911
- Termitophya inornata Seevers, 1937
- Termitophya peruanus Kistner, 2006
- Termitophya piliventris Seevers, 1937
- Termitophya punctata Mann, 1923

== Distribution ==
Species in this genus are found in Bolivia, Brazil, Ecuador, Guyana, Panama, Peru, and Trinidad & Tobago.
