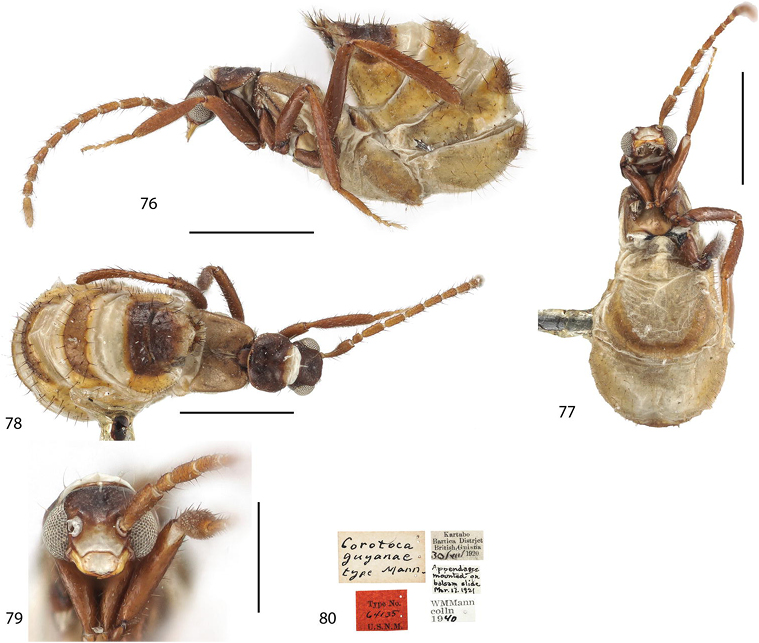
- Cavifronexus guyanae

Scientific classification
- Kingdom: Animalia
- Phylum: Arthropoda
- Clade: Pancrustacea
- Class: Insecta
- Order: Coleoptera
- Suborder: Polyphaga
- Infraorder: Staphyliniformia
- Family: Staphylinidae
- Subtribe: Corotocina
- Genus: Cavifronexus; Zilberman, 2020

= Cavifronexus =

Genus of beetle

Cavifronexus is a genus of termitophilous beetles in the family Staphylinidae. It was first described by the Brazilian entomologist Bruno Zilberman in 2020, and includes two species from the Neotropical region, recorded only from the Amazon rainforest, associated with termites of the genus Constrictotermes.

== Species ==
There are two species assigned to this genus:

- Cavifronexus guyanae (Mann, 1923)
- Cavifronexus papaveroi Zilberman, 2020

== Distribution ==
The species in this genus are found in Brazil and Guyana.
