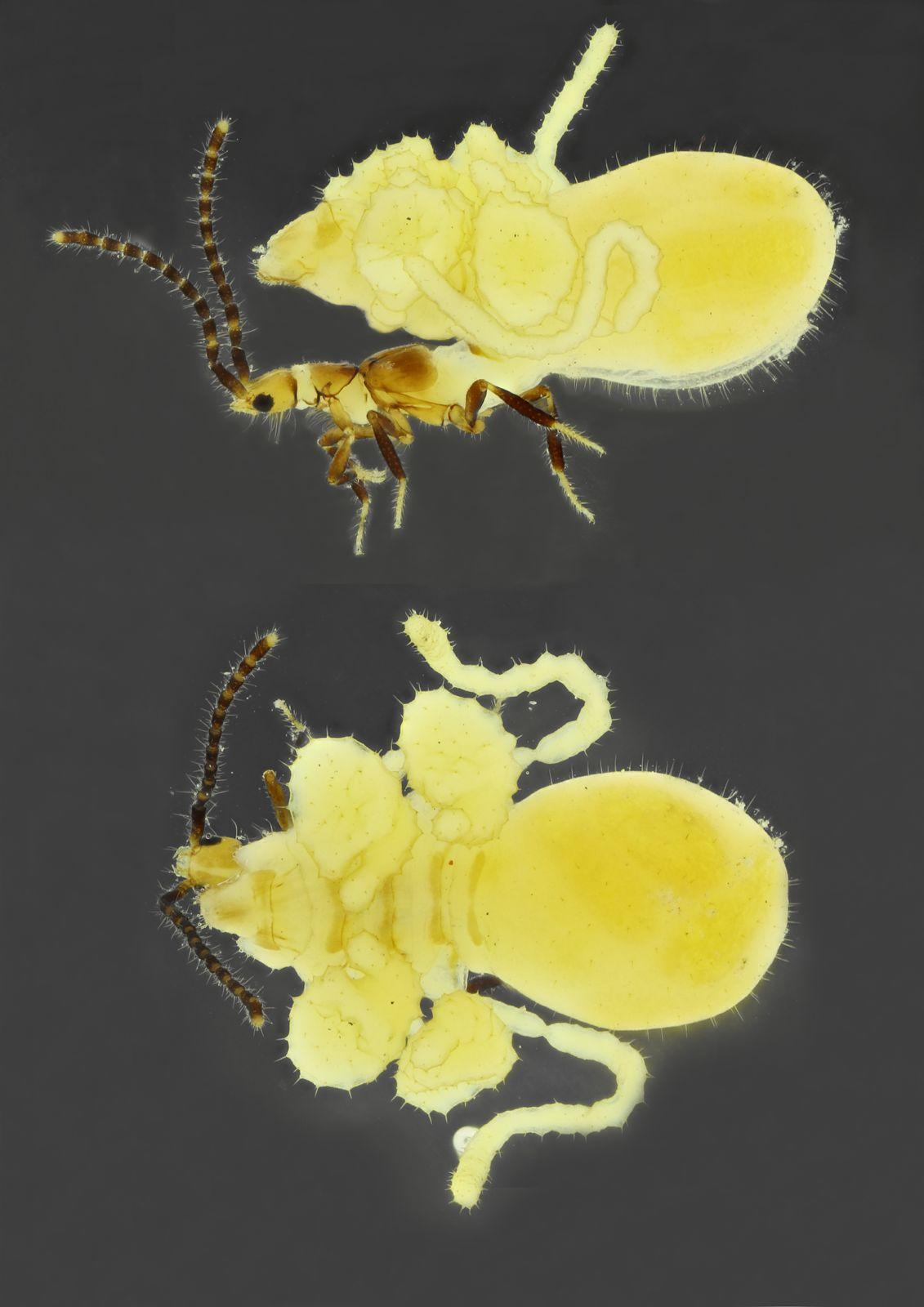
- Spirachtha eurymedusa

Scientific classification
- Kingdom: Animalia
- Phylum: Arthropoda
- Clade: Pancrustacea
- Class: Insecta
- Order: Coleoptera
- Suborder: Polyphaga
- Infraorder: Staphyliniformia
- Family: Staphylinidae
- Subfamily: Aleocharinae
- Tribe: Corotocini
- Subtribe: Corotocina
- Genus: Spirachtha; Schiødte, 1853

Type species
- Spirachtha eurymedusa Schiødte, 1853

= Spirachtha =

Genus of beetles

Spirachtha is a genus of termitophilous beetles in the family Staphylinidae, subfamily Aleocharinae, described by the Danish entomologist Jørgen Matthias Christian Schiødte in 1853, and includes three species from the Neotropical region, associated with termites of the genus Constrictotermes.

== Species ==
There are three species assigned to this genus:

- Spirachtha eurymedusa Schiødte, 1853
- Spirachtha mirabilis Mann, 1923
- Spirachtha schioedtei Mann, 1923

== Distribution ==
The type species, Spirachtha eurymedusa, is found in Brazil, while the other two species are found in Guyana.
