= Mimanommatini =

Scientific classification
- Kingdom: Animalia
- Phylum: Arthropoda
- Clade: Pancrustacea
- Class: Insecta
- Order: Coleoptera
- Suborder: Polyphaga
- Infraorder: Staphyliniformia
- Family: Staphylinidae
- Subfamily: Aleocharinae
- Tribe: Mimanommatini; Wasmann, 1912

Mimanommatini is a tribe of rove beetles in the subfamily Aleocharinae. It was first described by Wasmann in 1912. It contains 2 subtribes with 30 genera and 171 species.

== Subtribes and genera ==
- Dorylophilina
  - Demerilla
  - Demerina
  - Demerinda
  - Derelinda
  - Derema
  - Deremilla
  - Dorylobactrus
  - Dorylobius
  - Dorylocerus
  - Dorylonilla
  - Dorylophila
  - Dorylostethus
  - Draconula
  - Emerda
  - Fossulopora
  - Kamptomerus
  - Koilomera
  - Lokomera
  - Macfieia
  - Medera
  - Microbactrus
  - Nitinella
  - Notelyglypha
  - Ponerilla
  - Redema
  - Rhopalinda
  - Rodylopora
  - Rylodophila
- Mimanommatina
  - Mimanomma
  - Siafumimus
