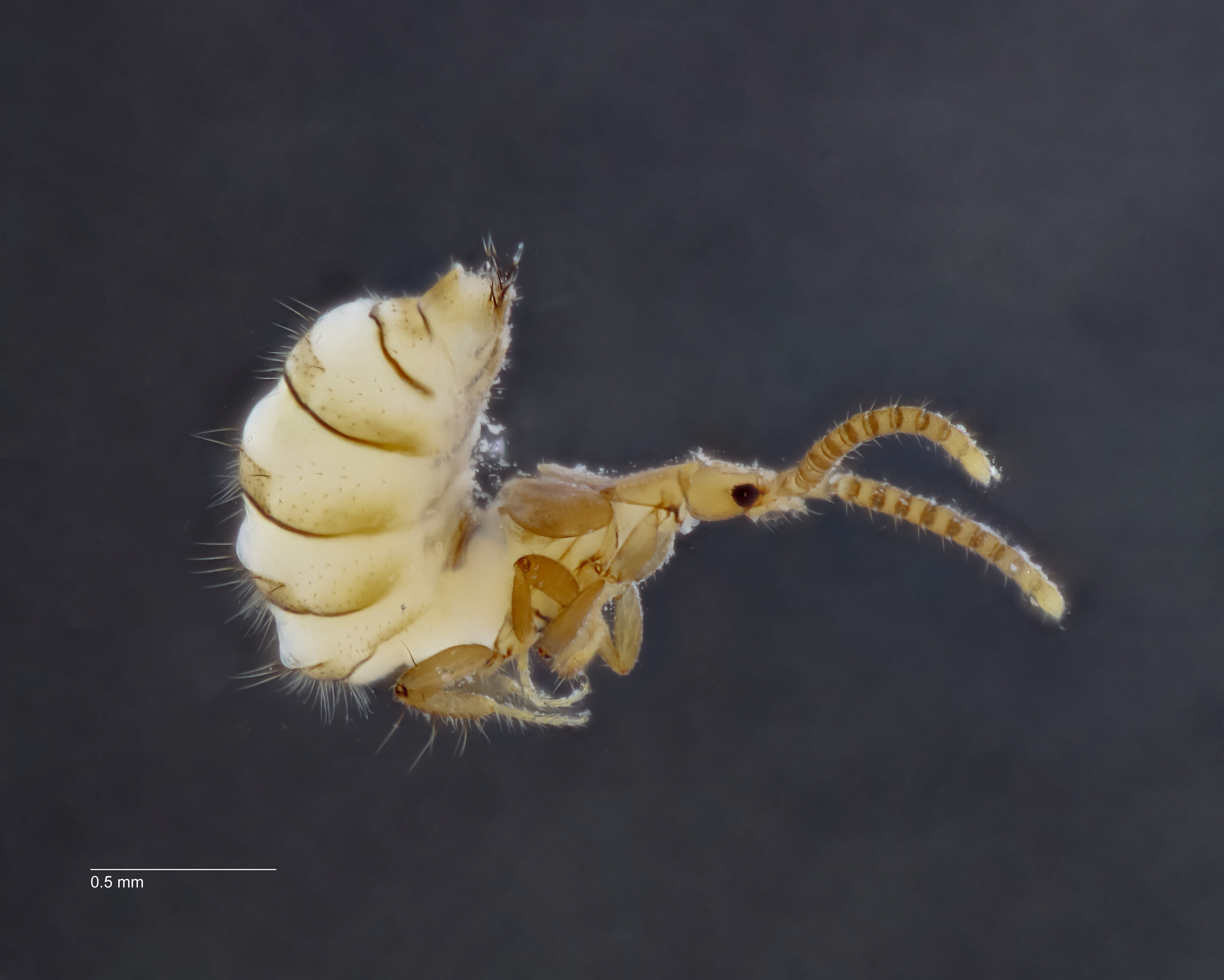
- Eburniola gastrovittata, lateral view

Scientific classification
- Kingdom: Animalia
- Phylum: Arthropoda
- Clade: Pancrustacea
- Class: Insecta
- Order: Coleoptera
- Suborder: Polyphaga
- Infraorder: Staphyliniformia
- Family: Staphylinidae
- Subtribe: Corotocina
- Genus: Eburniola; Mann, 1923

= Eburniola =

Genus of beetles

Eburniola is a genus of termitophilous beetles in the family Staphylinidae. It was first described by the American entomologist William Montana Mann in 1923, and includes three species from the Neotropical region, associated with termites of the genus Nasutitermes.

== Species ==
There are three species assigned to this genus:

- Eburniola gastrovittata Seevers, 1937
- Eburniola leucogaster Mann, 1923
- Eburniola lujae Seevers, 1957

== Distribution ==
Species in this genus are variously found in Brazil, Colombia, Guyana, Panama, Peru, and Trinidad and Tobago.
