= Platycholeus leptinoides =

Scientific classification
- Domain: Eukaryota
- Kingdom: Animalia
- Phylum: Arthropoda
- Class: Insecta
- Order: Coleoptera
- Suborder: Polyphaga
- Infraorder: Staphyliniformia
- Family: Leiodidae
- Genus: Platycholeus
- Species: P. leptinoides

Binomial name
- Platycholeus leptinoides (Crotch, 1874)

Species of beetle

Platycholeus leptinoides is a species of small carrion beetle in the family Leiodidae. It is found in North America. It is known to be termitophilous.
