= Austrospirachtha =

Scientific classification
- Kingdom: Animalia
- Phylum: Arthropoda
- Class: Insecta
- Order: Coleoptera
- Suborder: Polyphaga
- Infraorder: Staphyliniformia
- Family: Staphylinidae
- Subfamily: Aleocharinae
- Tribe: Corotocini
- Subtribe: Corotocina
- Genus: Austrospirachtha; Watson, 1973

Species
- Austrospirachtha carrijoi Zilberman & Pires-Silva, 2023; Austrospirachtha mimetes Watson, 1973

Genus of beetle

Austrospirachtha is a genus of rove beetle in the tribe Corotocini.

The type species of the genus, A. mimetes has an elongated abdomen that is bent over the body with appendages that give it a termite like appearance. They are thought to live within the nests of termites of the genus Nasutitermes.
