= Hypotermes makhamensis =

Scientific classification
- Kingdom: Animalia
- Phylum: Arthropoda
- Clade: Pancrustacea
- Class: Insecta
- Order: Blattodea
- Infraorder: Isoptera
- Family: Termitidae
- Genus: Hypotermes
- Species: H. makhamensis

Binomial name
- Hypotermes makhamensis Ahmad, 1965

Species of termite

Hypotermes makhamensis is a species of termite in the subfamily Macrotermitinae of the family Termitidae. It lives in dry evergreen forests in tropical south-eastern Asia and builds termite mounds in which it cultivates fungus for use as food.

== Distribution and habitat ==
Hypotermes makhamensis is native to Thailand, Vietnam and Cambodia. It is a forest-dwelling species and the colony builds and lives inside a complex epigeal (mound) nest. Termites are important in the ecology of the tropical and subtropical forests in the region as degraders of leaf litter and decomposers of dead wood.

== Behaviour ==
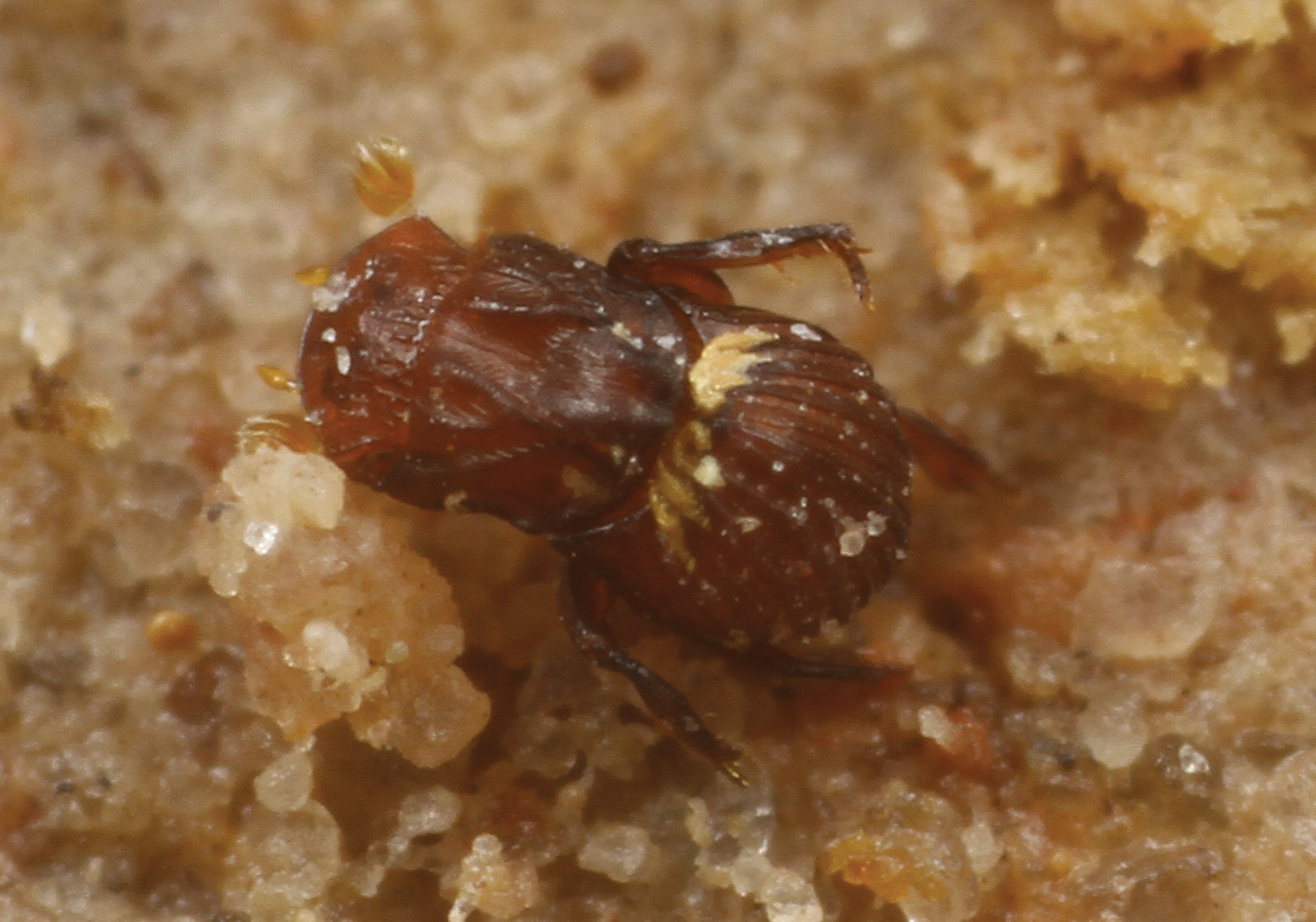
Beetle Termitotrox cupido walking on a fungus garden of H. makhamensis

In a study of termites in a forest in Thailand, fourteen nests of Hypotermes makhamensis were found per hectare. The termites forage on the forest floor, feeding on leaf litter and small and large pieces of dead wood.

These termites play an important role in the forest ecosystem and cultivate fungus gardens. The termites chew up fallen leaves and rotten wood and deposit faecal pellets in chambers in the nest. A fungus, a species of Termitomyces, grows on the partially digested plant material producing "fungus comb". The fungus degrades the lignin present and increases the digestibility of the cellulose. The older parts of the comb are subsequently eaten by the termites. This method of feeding is especially advantageous for termites living in areas of dry forests where little fungal degradation of leaf litter takes place because of the low level of humidity.

In other genera of termites such as Macrotermes, the main role of the fungus garden is to degrade lignin so as to enable the termites to make more efficient use of cellulose. However, in colonies of Hypotermes makhamensis, the garden's main role is to provide a nutritious food source, the termites principally feeding on the fungal mycelium rather than the digested product.

In Cambodia, a newly described species of tiny, blind, wingless scarab beetle, Termitotrox cupido, has been found inside the Hypotermes makhamensis mound, on the walls of the fungus garden chambers. Other species of termites also have Termitotrox beetles dwelling in their fungus gardens but it is unclear what role these beetles play in the termite colony.
