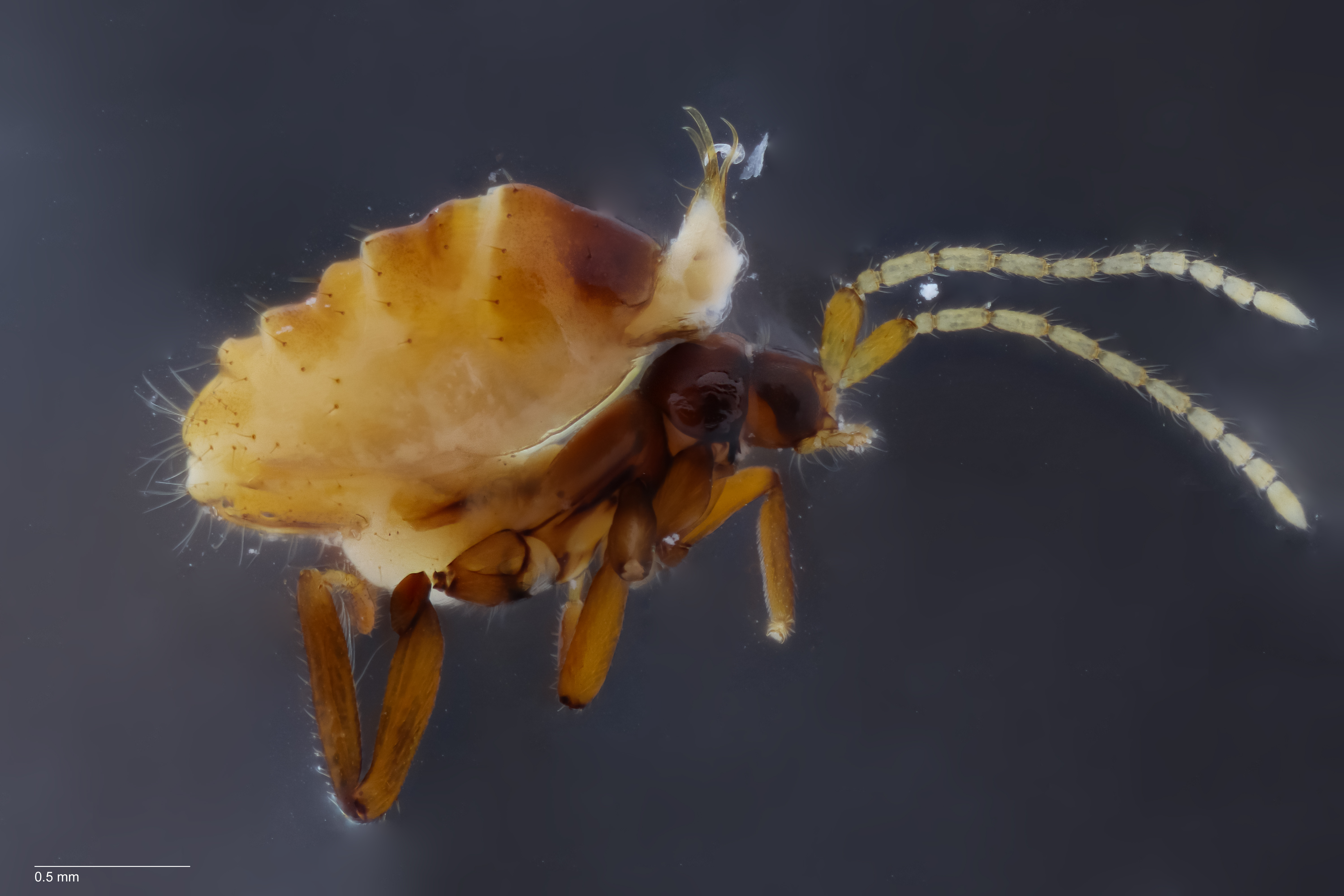
- Corotoca melantho, lateral view

Scientific classification
- Kingdom: Animalia
- Phylum: Arthropoda
- Clade: Pancrustacea
- Class: Insecta
- Order: Coleoptera
- Suborder: Polyphaga
- Infraorder: Staphyliniformia
- Family: Staphylinidae
- Subtribe: Corotocina
- Genus: Corotoca; Schiødte, 1853

= Corotoca =

Genus of beetle

Corotoca is a genus of termitophilous beetles in the family Staphylinidae, subfamily Aleocharinae, described by the Danish entomologist Jørgen Matthias Christian Schiødte in 1853, and includes six species from the Neotropical region. It is associated with termites of the genus Constrictotermes. The genus was the first record of insects associated with termites.

== Species ==
There are six species assigned to this genus:

- Corotoca araujoi Seevers, 1957
- Corotoca fontesi Zilberman, 2018
- Corotoca hitchensi Zilberman, 2020
- Corotoca melantho Schiødte, 1853
- Corotoca phylo Schiødte, 1853
- Corotoca pseudomelantho Zilberman, 2020

== Distribution ==
Species in this genus are variously found in Argentina, Brazil, and Guyana.
