= Eburniogastrina =

Scientific classification
- Kingdom: Animalia
- Phylum: Arthropoda
- Clade: Pancrustacea
- Class: Insecta
- Order: Coleoptera
- Suborder: Polyphaga
- Infraorder: Staphyliniformia
- Family: Staphylinidae
- Subfamily: Aleocharinae
- Tribe: Corotocini
- Subtribe: Eburniogastrina; Jacobson, Kistner & Pasteels, 1986

Eburniogastrina is a subtribe of rove beetles in the tribe Corotocini. It was first described by Kistner and Pasteels in 1986. It contains two genera, and 7 accepted species.

== Genera and species ==
- Eburniogaster
  - Eburniogaster anahuaci
  - Eburniogaster termitocola
  - Eburniogaster taxanus
- Termitonida
  - Termitonida jaliscensis
  - Termitonida lunata
  - Termitonida michoacani
  - Termitonida tarascani
