= Timeparthenina =

Scientific classification
- Kingdom: Animalia
- Phylum: Arthropoda
- Clade: Pancrustacea
- Class: Insecta
- Order: Coleoptera
- Suborder: Polyphaga
- Infraorder: Staphyliniformia
- Family: Staphylinidae
- Tribe: Corotocini
- Subtribe: Timeparthenina; Fenyes, 1921

Timeparthenina is a subtribe of rove beetles in the tribe Corotocini. It was first described by Fenyes in 1921. It contains 5 genera with 15 species.

== Genera ==
- Ptocholellus
- Reginamimus
- Termitozophilus
- Termituncula
- Timeparthenus
