= Deremilla collarti =

Scientific classification
- Kingdom: Animalia
- Phylum: Arthropoda
- Class: Insecta
- Order: Coleoptera
- Suborder: Polyphaga
- Infraorder: Staphyliniformia
- Family: Staphylinidae
- Genus: Deremilla
- Species: D. collarti

Binomial name
- Deremilla collarti Kistner & Jacobson, 1979: 235; Cameron, 1932, fixed by original designation.

Species of beetle

Deremilla collarti is a species of beetle in the genus Deremilla.
