= Sphuridaethes =

Scientific classification
- Kingdom: Animalia
- Phylum: Arthropoda
- Clade: Pancrustacea
- Class: Insecta
- Order: Coleoptera
- Suborder: Polyphaga
- Infraorder: Staphyliniformia
- Family: Staphylinidae
- Subfamily: Aleocharinae
- Tribe: Corotocini
- Subtribe: Sphuridaethina; Pace, 1988
- Genus: Sphuridaethes; Pace, 1988
- Species: S. loebli

Binomial name
- Sphuridaethes loebli Pace, 1988

Sphuridaethina is a subtribe of rove beetles in the tribe Corotocini. It was first described by Pace in 1988. It contains one genus, Sphuridaethes, with one species, Sphuridaethes loebli.
