= Termitogastrina =

Scientific classification
- Kingdom: Animalia
- Phylum: Arthropoda
- Clade: Pancrustacea
- Class: Insecta
- Order: Coleoptera
- Suborder: Polyphaga
- Infraorder: Staphyliniformia
- Family: Staphylinidae
- Tribe: Corotocini
- Subtribe: Termitogastrina; Bernhauer & Scheerpeltz, 1926

Termitogastrina is a subtribe of rove beetless in the tribe Corotocini. It was first described by Bernhauer and Scheerpeltz in 1926. It contains 19 genera and 82 accepted species.

== Genera ==
- Idiogaster
- Idioptochus
- Leucoptochus
- Melanoptochus
- Millotoca
- Neotermitogaster
- Rhadinoxenus
- Termella
- Termitella
- Termitellodes
- Termitogaster
- Termitoides
- Termitomorpha
- Termitonasus
- Termitosyne
- Termitosynodes
- Trachopeplus
- Xenogaster
- Xenopelta
