= Deremilla =

Scientific classification
- Domain: Eukaryota
- Kingdom: Animalia
- Phylum: Arthropoda
- Class: Insecta
- Order: Coleoptera
- Suborder: Polyphaga
- Infraorder: Staphyliniformia
- Family: Staphylinidae
- Subfamily: Aleocharinae
- Tribe: Mimanommatini
- Subtribe: Dorylophilina
- Genus: Deremilla; Jacobson and Kistner, 1979: 235

Genus of beetles

Deremilla is a genus of beetles in the subtribe Dorylophilina of the family Staphylinidae. Its species are Deremilla liberiensis and Deremilla collarti.
