= Deremilla liberiensis =

Scientific classification
- Kingdom: Animalia
- Phylum: Arthropoda
- Class: Insecta
- Order: Coleoptera
- Suborder: Polyphaga
- Infraorder: Staphyliniformia
- Family: Staphylinidae
- Genus: Deremilla
- Species: D. liberiensis

Binomial name
- Deremilla liberiensis Kistner & Jacobson, 1979: 241

Species of beetle

Deremilla liberiensis is a species of beetle in the genus Deremilla. It is natively found in Cameroon, Ghana, Ivory Coast, Liberia.
