= Termitocupidus =

Scientific classification
- Kingdom: Animalia
- Phylum: Arthropoda
- Clade: Pancrustacea
- Class: Insecta
- Order: Coleoptera
- Suborder: Polyphaga
- Infraorder: Staphyliniformia
- Family: Staphylinidae
- Subfamily: Aleocharinae
- Tribe: Corotocini
- Subtribe: Termitocupidina; Jacobson, Kistner & Pasteels, 1986
- Genus: Termitocupidus; Jacobson, Kistner & Pasteels, 1986
- Species: T. judithae

Binomial name
- Termitocupidus judithae Jacobson, Kistner & Pasteels, 1986

Genus of beetles

Termitocupidina is a subtribe of rove beetles in the tribe Corotocini. It was first described by Jacobson, Kistner, and Pasteels in 1986. It contains one genera, Termitocupidus, with one species, Termitocupidus judithae.
