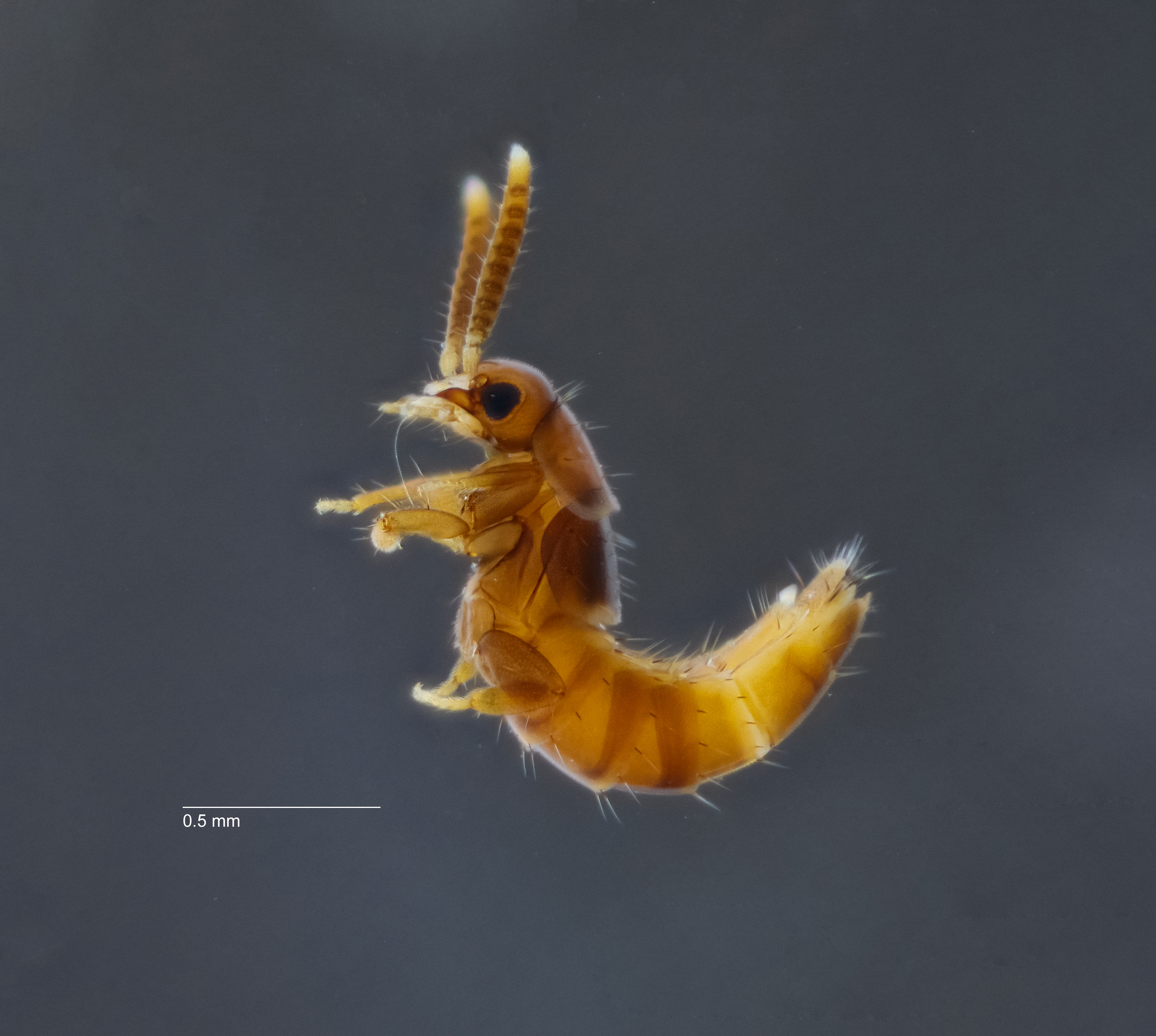
- Abroteles beaumonti, lateral view

Scientific classification
- Kingdom: Animalia
- Phylum: Arthropoda
- Clade: Pancrustacea
- Class: Insecta
- Order: Coleoptera
- Suborder: Polyphaga
- Infraorder: Staphyliniformia
- Family: Staphylinidae
- Subfamily: Aleocharinae
- Tribe: Corotocini
- Genus: Abroteles; Casey, 1890

Species
- See text

= Abroteles =

Genus of beetles

Abroteles is a genus of small termitophilous beetles of the family Staphylinidae ("rove beetles"), belonging to the order Coleoptera. The genus was described by American entomologist, Thomas Lincoln Casey Jr. in 1890 and currently includes nine species recorded from the neotropical region.

== Species ==
The following species are assigned to this genus:

- Abroteles badia Seevers, 1957
- Abroteles beaumonti Casey, 1890
- Abroteles bisetosus Seevers, 1937
- Abroteles compacticornis Borgmeier, 1950
- Abroteles lobata Seevers, 1957
- Abroteles philetaerus (Silvestri, 1901)
- Abroteles pubicollis Seevers, 1957
- Abroteles rurrenabaquensis Seevers, 1946
- Abroteles setulosus Fontes, 1978
