= Friedrich Wasmann =

German painter

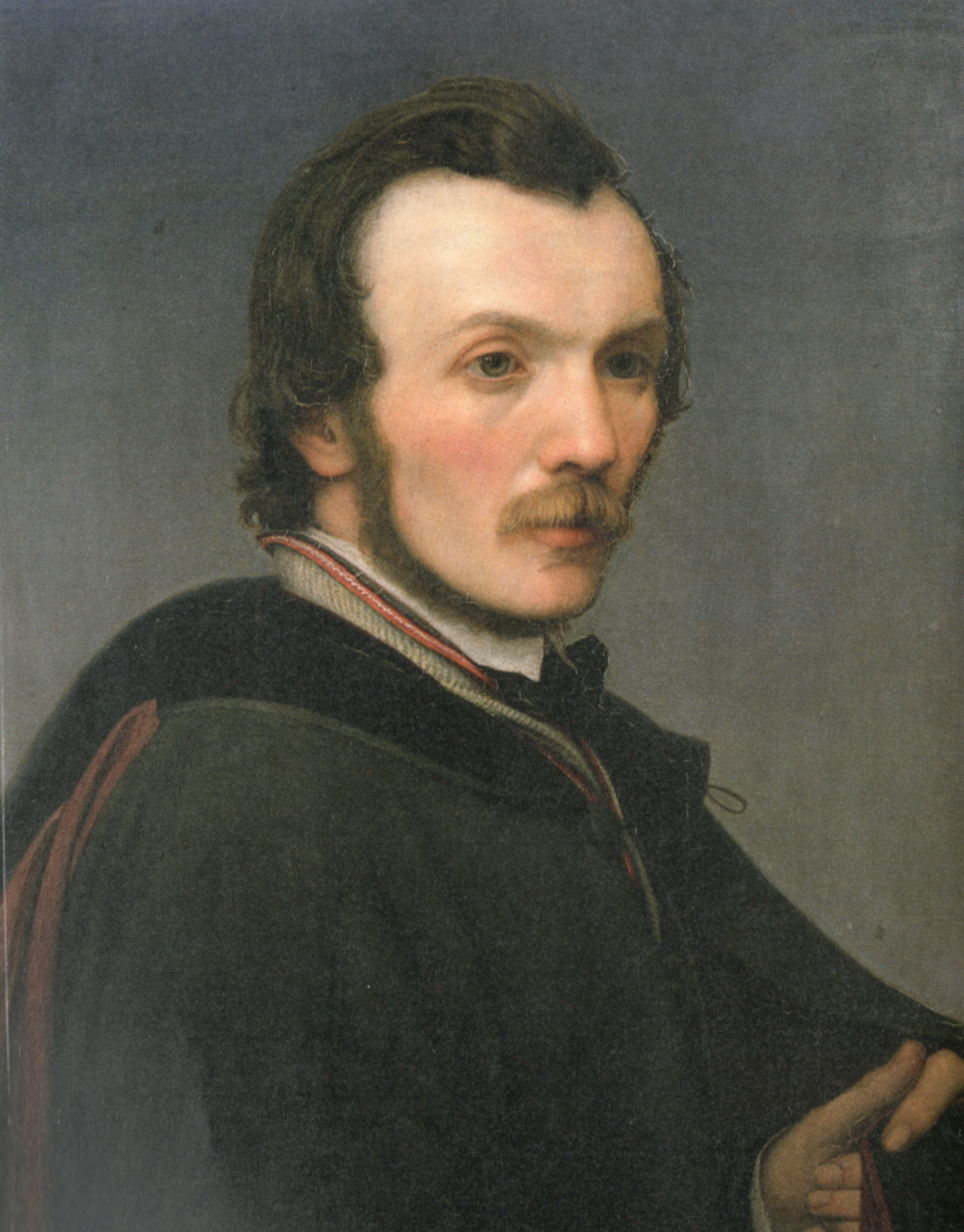
Self-portrait (1846)

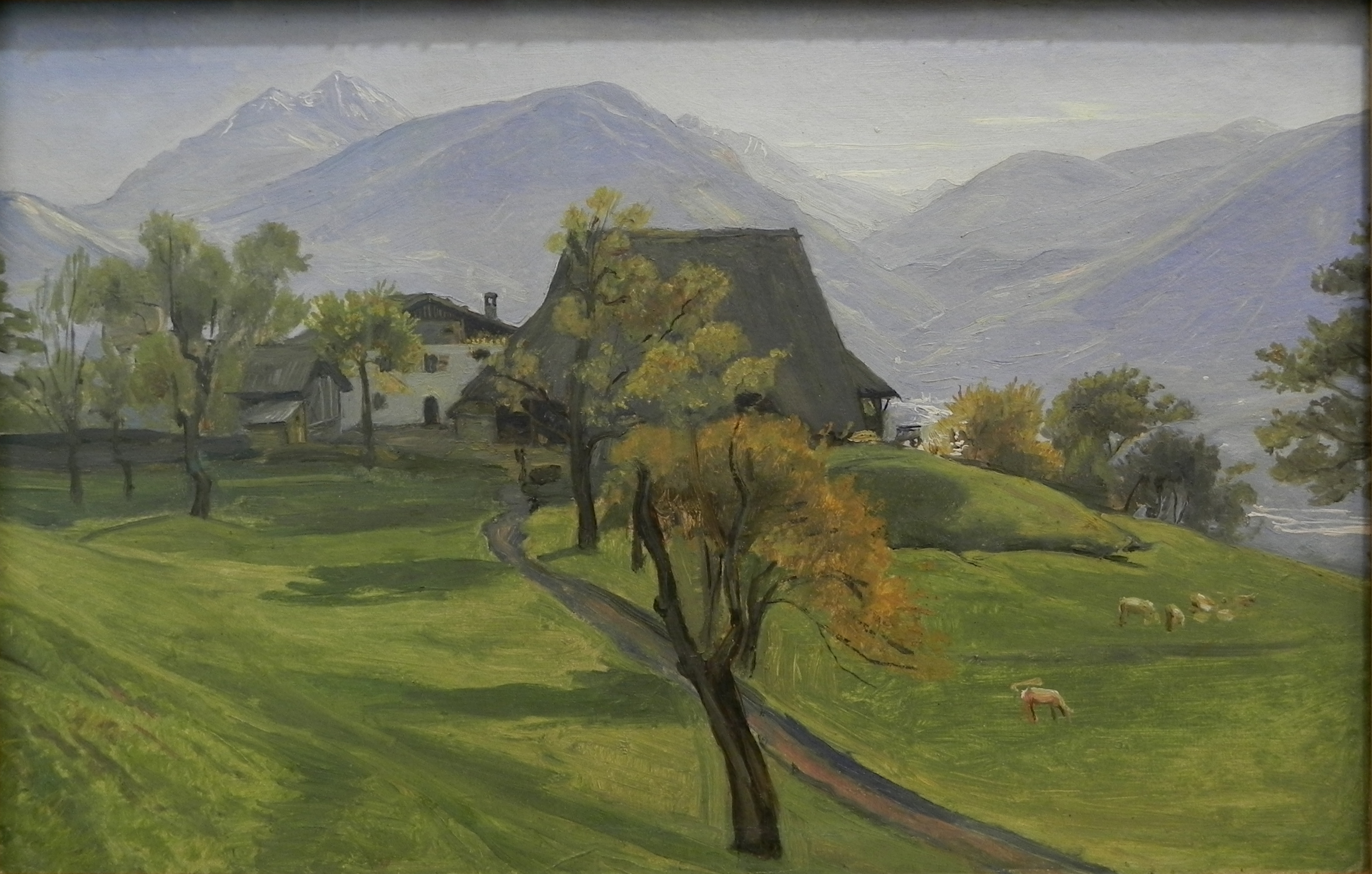
Farm in Merano (1831)

Rudolph Friedrich Wasmann (1805 August 8 – 1886 May 10 ) was a German-born painter in the Biedermeier style. He spent most of his life in a part of the Tyrol that is now in Italy.

== Life ==
He was born in Hamburg. At the age of seventeen, he began an apprenticeship with the painter Christoffer Suhr. Then, after several years of study at the Dresden Academy of Fine Arts and the Academy of Fine Arts, Munich, he spent two years in Merano. From 1832 to 1835 he lived in Rome, where he came under the influence of Friedrich Overbeck, Joseph Anton Koch, and other members of the Nazarene movement. He eventually converted to Catholicism.

After six more years spent in Merano and Bolzano, where he worked as a portrait painter, he returned to Hamburg, where he was introduced to his future wife, Emilie Krämer. They married in 1846 and went to live with her step-mother back in Merano. In addition to portraits, he produced landscapes and religiously-themed works in Nazarene style as well as a popular autobiography. Many of his works are on display at the Kunsthalle Hamburg. A street in the Barmbek-Nord district is named after him.

His son was the Jesuit priest and entomologist, Erich Wasmann.

== Autobiography ==
- Ein deutsches Künstlerleben, von ihm selbst geschildert. Edited by Bernt Grønvold, Verlagsanstalt F. Bruckmann Aktien-Gesellschaft (1896), "Popular edition" by Insel-Verlag (1915)
