= Nasutitella =

Scientific classification
- Kingdom: Animalia
- Phylum: Arthropoda
- Clade: Pancrustacea
- Class: Insecta
- Order: Coleoptera
- Suborder: Polyphaga
- Infraorder: Staphyliniformia
- Family: Staphylinidae
- Subfamily: Aleocharinae
- Tribe: Corotocini
- Subtribe: Nasutitellina; Jacobson, Kistner & Pasteels, 1986
- Genus: Nasutitella; Pasteels, 1967
- Species: N. puncticollis

Binomial name
- Nasutitella puncticollis Pasteels, 1967

Nasutitellina is a subtribe of rove beetles in the tribe Corotocini. It was first described by Jacobson, Kistner, and Pasteels in 1986. It contains one genus, Nasutitella, with one species, Nasutitella puncticollis.
