= Termitopithus =

Scientific classification
- Kingdom: Animalia
- Phylum: Arthropoda
- Clade: Pancrustacea
- Class: Insecta
- Order: Coleoptera
- Suborder: Polyphaga
- Infraorder: Staphyliniformia
- Family: Staphylinidae
- Subfamily: Aleocharinae
- Tribe: Corotocini
- Subtribe: Termitopithina; Jacobson, Kistner & Pasteels, 1986
- Genus: Termitopithus; Seevers, 1957
- Species: T. crassiusculus

Binomial name
- Termitopithus crassiusculus Seevers, 1957

Genus of beetles

Termitopithina is a subtribe of rove beetles in the tribe Corotocini. It was first described by Jacobson, Kistner, and Pasteels in 1986. It contains one genus, Termitopithus, and one species, Termitopithus crassiusculus.
