= Corotocina =

Scientific classification
- Domain: Eukaryota
- Kingdom: Animalia
- Phylum: Arthropoda
- Class: Insecta
- Order: Coleoptera
- Suborder: Polyphaga
- Infraorder: Staphyliniformia
- Family: Staphylinidae
- Subfamily: Aleocharinae
- Tribe: Corotocini
- Subtribe: Corotocina; Fenyes, 1918

Genera
- See text

Subtribe of beetle

Corotocina is a subtribe of rove beetles in the family Staphylinidae. It contains 20 genera:

- Austrospirachtha Watson, 1973
- Cavifronexus Zilberman, 2020
- Coatonachthodes Kistner, 1968
- Corotoca Schiødte, 1853
- Eburniola Mann, 1923
- Fulleroxenus Kistner, 1970
- Nasutimimus Kistner, 1968
- Nasutiptochus Jacobson & Pasteels, 1992
- Neoguinella Pasteels & Jacobson, 1984
- Nigriphilus Jacobson, Kistner & Pasteels, 1986
- Oideprosoma Silvestri, 1920
- †Pareburniola Zilberman, Zi-Wei Yin & Chen-Yang Cai, 2022
- Spirachtha Schiødte, 1853
- Spirachthodes Seevers, 1960
- Termitomimus Trägårdh, 1907
- Termitoptocinus Silvestri, 1921
- Termitopula Seevers, 1965
- Termitopullus Reichensperger, 1922
- Thyreoxenus Mann, 1923
- Tumulipcinus Jacobson & Kistner, 1999
