= Termitochara =

Scientific classification
- Kingdom: Animalia
- Phylum: Arthropoda
- Clade: Pancrustacea
- Class: Insecta
- Order: Coleoptera
- Suborder: Polyphaga
- Infraorder: Staphyliniformia
- Family: Staphylinidae
- Subfamily: Aleocharinae
- Tribe: Corotocini
- Subtribe: Termitocharina; Seevers, 1957
- Genus: Termitochara; Wasmann, 1893
- Species: T. kraatzi

Binomial name
- Termitochara kraatzi Wasmann, 1893

Termitocharina is a subtribe of rove beetles in the tribe Corotocini. It was first described by Seevers in 1957. It contains one genus, Termitochara, with one species, Termitochara kraatzi.
