= Termitoptochina =

Scientific classification
- Kingdom: Animalia
- Phylum: Arthropoda
- Clade: Pancrustacea
- Class: Insecta
- Order: Coleoptera
- Suborder: Polyphaga
- Infraorder: Staphyliniformia
- Family: Staphylinidae
- Tribe: Corotocini
- Subtribe: Termitoptochina; Fenyes, 1921

Termitoptochina is a subtribe of rove beetles in the tribe Corotocini. It was first described by Fenyes in 1921. It contains 6 genera, and 20 species.

== Genera ==
- Affinoptochus
- Austaloptochus
- Eutermitoptochus
- Hospitaliptochus
- Paracorotoca
- Termitoptochus
