= Termitoiceina =

Scientific classification
- Kingdom: Animalia
- Phylum: Arthropoda
- Clade: Pancrustacea
- Class: Insecta
- Order: Coleoptera
- Suborder: Polyphaga
- Infraorder: Staphyliniformia
- Family: Staphylinidae
- Tribe: Corotocini
- Subtribe: Termitoiceina; Jacobson, Kistner & Pasteels, 1986

Termitoiceina is a subtribe of rove beetles in the tribe Corotocini. It was first described by Jacobson, Kistner, and Pasteels in 1986. It contains 6 genera with 13 accepted species.

== Genera ==
- Fonsechellus
- Mormellus
- Oecidiophilus
- Paridolum
- Perlinctus
- Termitoiceus
