= Erich Wasmann =

Austrian entomologist and Jesuit priest

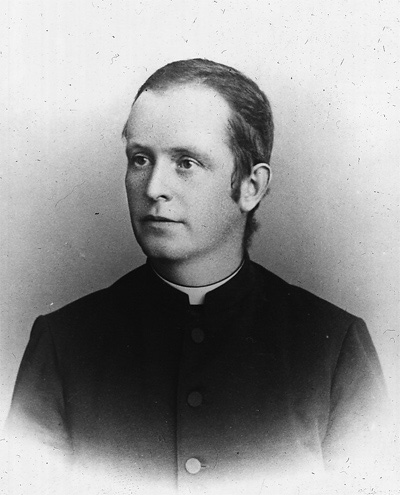
Erich Wasmann.

Erich Wasmann SJ (29 May 1859 in Merano − 27 February 1931 in Valkenburg, Netherlands) was an Austrian (born in South Tyrol) Jesuit priest and entomologist, specializing in ants and termites. He described the phenomenon known as Wasmannian mimicry and became a prominent Catholic popularizer of science, grounded in Christian beliefs, around 1900.

Wasmann was a supporter of evolution, although he did not accept the productivity of natural selection, the evolution of humans from other animals, or universal common descent of all life. Rather, he believed that common ancestry was restricted to what he called "natural species" which were generally larger groups than species (which he called "systematic species"), genera, or even families. His natural species he identified with the "paleontological species" of Melchior Neumayr.

Wasmann's reflections on evolution, while viewed with some concern by his Jesuit superiors, were popular among Catholics; he was invited to write an article on evolution for the American Catholic Encyclopedia. He was involved in a long-running dispute with Ernst Haeckel over Monism, and was friends with Eberhard Dennert and Johannes Reinke, both of Protestant faith, who also opposed Haeckel and supported the Kepler Association.

His father was the painter Friedrich Wasmann.

== Partial bibliography ==
- Die hl. [heilige] Hildegard von Bingen als Naturforscherin [St. Hildegard of Bingen as Natural Scientist], Kempten: J. Kösel, 1914.
- Die moderne Biologie und die Entwicklungstheorie, 2nd edition, Freiburg im Breisgau: Herder, 1904
- Modern Biology and the Theory of Evolution, Translated from the 3d German of the preceding, ed. by A. M. Buchanan. London, K. Paul, Trench, Trübner & Co., ltd., 1910.
- Vergleichende Studien über das Seelenleben der Ameisen und der höhern Thiere, Freiburg im Breisgau: Herder, 1898.
- Comparative Studies in the Psychology of Ants and of Higher Animals. Authorized English version of the 2d German ed. of the preceding. St. Louis, Mo. Freiburg (Baden), B. Herder. 1905.
- Instinct und Intelligenz im Thierreich: Ein kritischer Beitrag zur modernen Thierpsychologie. Freiburg im Breisgau: Herder, 1897.
- Instinct and Intelligence in the Animal Kingdom. A Critical Contribution to Modern Animal Psychology, by Eric Wasmann, S.J. Authorized translation of the 2d and enl. ed. of the preceding. St. Louis, Mo., B. Herder, 1903.
- Der christliche Monismus.
- Christian Monism; meditations on Christian truths in the language of modern thought. / Authorized translation of the preceding with an introduction by Rev. Spencer Jones. St. Louis, Mo.: B. Herder, 1923.
- The Berlin discussion of the problem of evolution; Full Report of the Lectures Given in February, 1907, and of the Evening Discussion. London, K. Paul, Trench, Trübner & co., ltd., 1909.

== Collection ==
Wasmann's collection of Formicidae, Isoptera, and myrmecophile and termitophile Coleoptera (especially Staphylinidae) is in the Maastricht Natural History Museum.

== Namesakes ==
From 1936 to 1994, a biological journal variously called The Wasmann Club Collector, The Wasmann Collector or The Wasmann Journal of Biology was published by the University of San Francisco with notable editors that included Edward L. Kessel and Robert T. Orr.
