= Austrospirachtha carrijoi =

Scientific classification
- Kingdom: Animalia
- Phylum: Arthropoda
- Class: Insecta
- Order: Coleoptera
- Suborder: Polyphaga
- Infraorder: Staphyliniformia
- Family: Staphylinidae
- Genus: Austrospirachtha
- Species: A. carrijoi

Binomial name
- Austrospirachtha carrijoi Zilberman & Pires-Silva, 2023

Species of beetle

Austrospirachtha carrijoi is a species of rove beetle that is native to northern Australia. It has an enlarged abdomen that extends over its entire body and that appears remarkably like a termite, and uses that disguise to steal food from true termites.

The type species of the genus, A. mimetes, also has an elongated abdomen that is bent over the body with appendages that give it a termite like appearance. They are thought to live within the nests of termites of the genus Nasutitermes.
