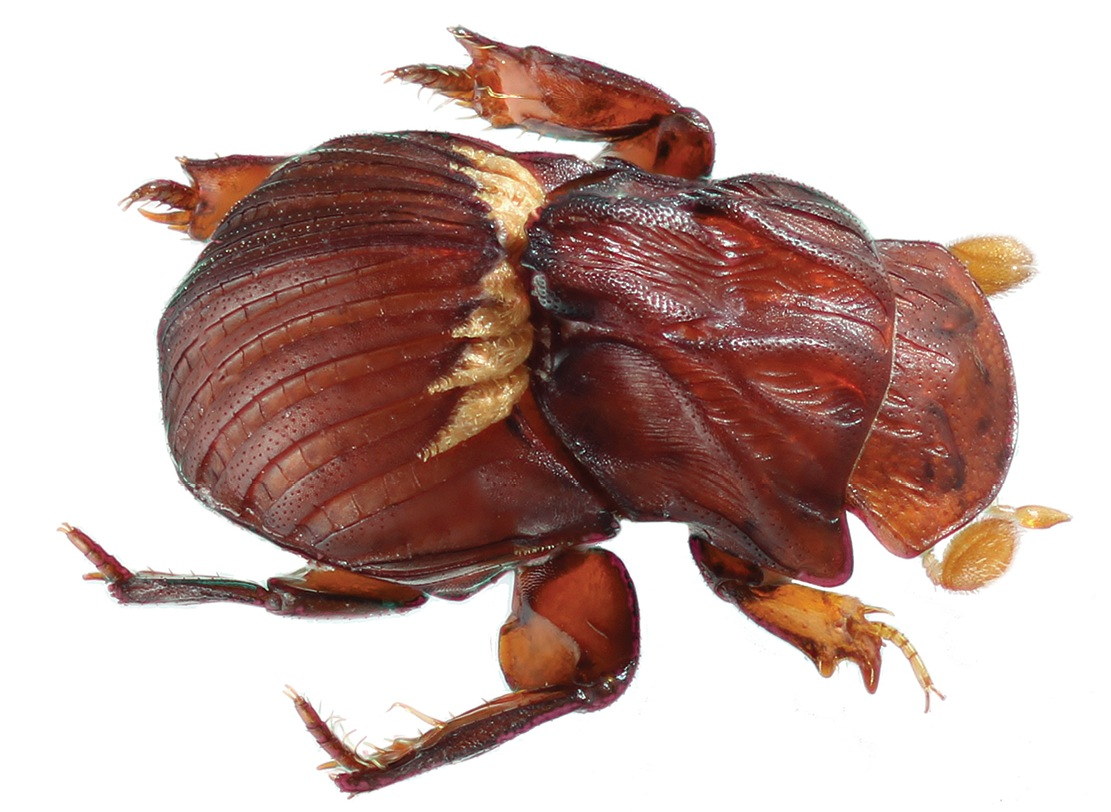
- Holotype

Scientific classification
- Kingdom: Animalia
- Phylum: Arthropoda
- Class: Insecta
- Order: Coleoptera
- Suborder: Polyphaga
- Infraorder: Scarabaeiformia
- Family: Scarabaeidae
- Genus: Termitotrox
- Species: T. cupido

Binomial name
- Termitotrox cupido Maruyama, 2012

= Termitotrox cupido =

Species of beetle

Termitotrox cupido is a species of scarab beetle in the subfamily Termitotroginae. It was first described by Munetoshi Maruyama in 2012, having been discovered living inside a nest of the termite Hypotermes makhamensis in Cambodia. It is a tiny, blind and flightless insect.

== Description ==
Termitotrox cupido grows to a length of 1.2 mm (0.047 in) and at the time of its description was the smallest known scarab beetle. It is a blind, flightless beetle with semi-spherical elytra which are sculpted with deep longitudinal grooves. The elytra bear wing-shaped trichomes (outgrowths), a feature that distinguishes this species from other members of the genus. The head, thorax and elytra are reddish-brown with a matt surface and the trichomes are a paler colour. The specific name "cupido" comes from the resemblance of the trichomes to the wings of Cupid, the child god from Greek mythology.

== Distribution and habitat ==
The genus Termitotrox comprises eleven species of scarab beetle, eight from Africa and three from the Indian subcontinent. These beetles have no wings and are blind, and the previously known species all live inside the nests of termites of the genera Odontotermes and Protermes. These termites construct chambers in which they deposit faecal pellets on which a fungus grows. The termites feed on the "fungal comb" produced and the beetles are also found on the comb.

Termitotrox cupido has been found inside colonies of the termite Hypotermes makhamensis in Cambodia, living on the walls of the chambers that house the fungus garden. This is the first time a member of the genus Hypotermes has been found to be associated with a beetle. The host termites live in tropical dry evergreen forests and build above-ground mound-type nests. The termites forage among the leaf litter and in tree stumps and rotting logs and bring partially digested plant material back to the nest to deposit in the fungus garden.

== Beetle behaviour ==
The behaviour of Termitrox beetles living symbiotically inside termite colonies has been little studied. In the case of T. cupido, the trichomes on the elytra are thought to be composed of glandular tissue which may produce chemicals that influence termite behaviour. Adults of another species of beetle that lives in termite nests were observed being carried around by their Macrotermes hosts, in a manner similar to the way the termites carry their young. The function of these beetles in their termite colonies is unclear but it seems that they are likely to be obligatory termitophiles and somehow contribute to the nest environment of their fungus-growing hosts.
