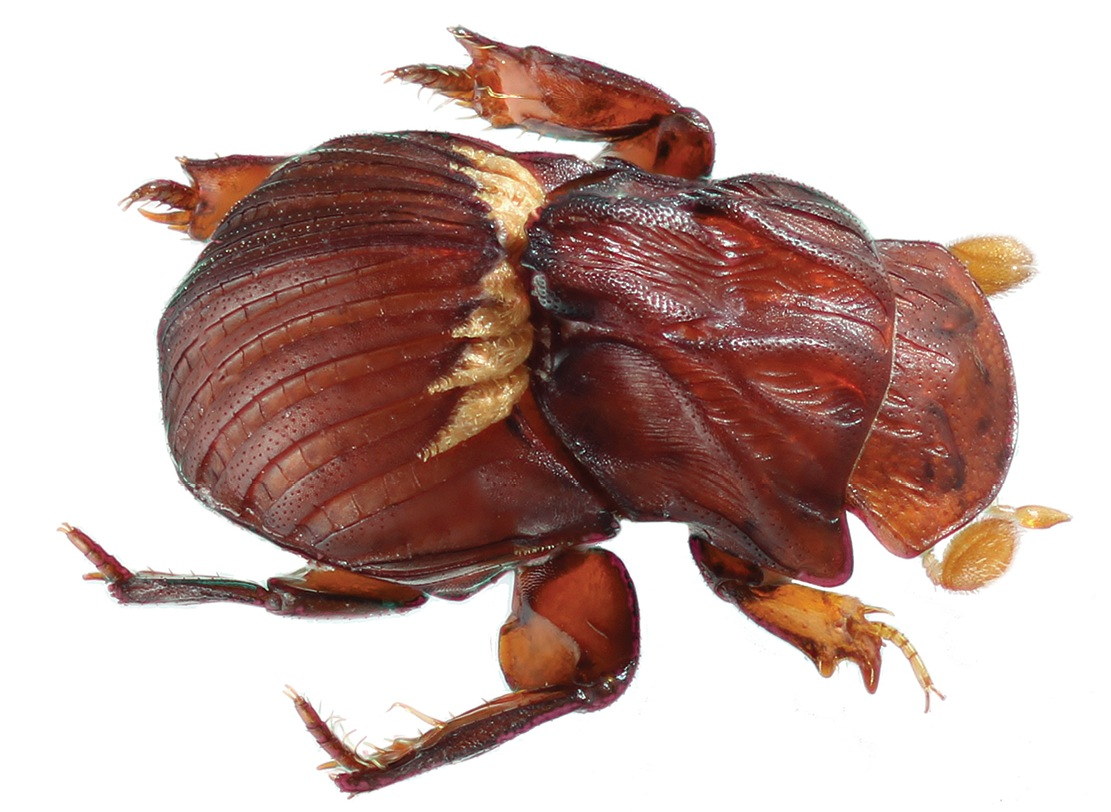
- Termitotrox cupido

Scientific classification
- Kingdom: Animalia
- Phylum: Arthropoda
- Class: Insecta
- Order: Coleoptera
- Suborder: Polyphaga
- Infraorder: Scarabaeiformia
- Family: Scarabaeidae
- Subfamily: Termitotroginae; Wasmann, 1918
- Genus: Termitotrox; Reichensperger, 1915

Genera
- Termitotrox Reichensperger, 1915

Synonyms
- Aphodiocopris Arrow, 1920

= Termitotrox =

Subfamily of beetles

Termitotroginae is a monotypic subfamily of the family Scarabaeidae, the scarab beetles. The only genus in the subfamily is Termititrox. A second genus, Aphodiocopris, Arrow, 1920, has been synonymised with Termitotrox. All known members of this subfamily are tiny, blind and flightless, and are termitophiles, dwelling within the fungal gardens of colonies of species of termite in Africa or tropical Asia.

Termitotrogins are characterised by having no eyes and no wings, and their pronotum and elytra have a distinctive patterning of ribs and grooves. The function of the beetles in the termite colony is unclear but it seems that they are likely to be obligatory termitophiles and somehow play an important role in the nest environment of their fungus-growing hosts.

== Species ==
The following species are included in the genus Termitotrox:

- Termitotrox ancoroides (Petrovitz, 1956) – Eastern Democratic Republic of the Congo
- Termitotrox consobrinus Reichensperger, 1915 – Republic of South Africa and KwazuluNatal
- Termitotrox cupido Maruyama, 2012 - Cambodia
- Termitotrox kenyensis Paulian, 1985 – Kenya
- Termitotrox maynei Reichensperger, 1956 – Eastern Democratic Republic of the Congo
- Termitotrox minutus (Arrow, 1920) – India
- Termitotrox monodi Paulian, 1947 – Ivory Coast
- Termitotrox permirus Wasmann, 1918 – India
- Termitotrox turkanicus Krikken, 2008 – Kenya
- Termitotrox usambaricus Krikken, 2008 – Tanzania
- Termitotrox vanbruggeni Krikken, 2008 – Kenya
