= Corotocini =

Scientific classification
- Kingdom: Animalia
- Phylum: Arthropoda
- Clade: Pancrustacea
- Class: Insecta
- Order: Coleoptera
- Suborder: Polyphaga
- Infraorder: Staphyliniformia
- Family: Staphylinidae
- Subfamily: Aleocharinae
- Tribe: Corotocini; Fenyes, 1918

Subtribe
- See text

Tribe of beetle

Corotocini is a tribe of rove beetles in the family Staphylinidae. It contains 68 genera classified within the following 12 subtribes:

- Abrotelina Seevers, 1957
- Corotocina Fenyes, 1918
- Eburniogastrina Jacobson, Kistner & Pasteels, 1986
- Nasutitellina Jacobson, Kistner & Pasteels, 1986
- Sphuridaethina Pace, 1988
- Termitocharina Seevers, 1957
- Termitocupidina Jacobson, Kistner & Pasteels, 1986
- Termitogastrina Bernhauer & Scheerpeltz, 1926
- Termitoiceina Jacobson, Kistner & Pasteels, 1986
- Termitopithina Jacobson, Kistner & Pasteels, 1986
- Termitoptochina Fenyes, 1921
- Timeparthenina Fenyes, 1921
