= Termitophile =

Organisms with a relationship to termites

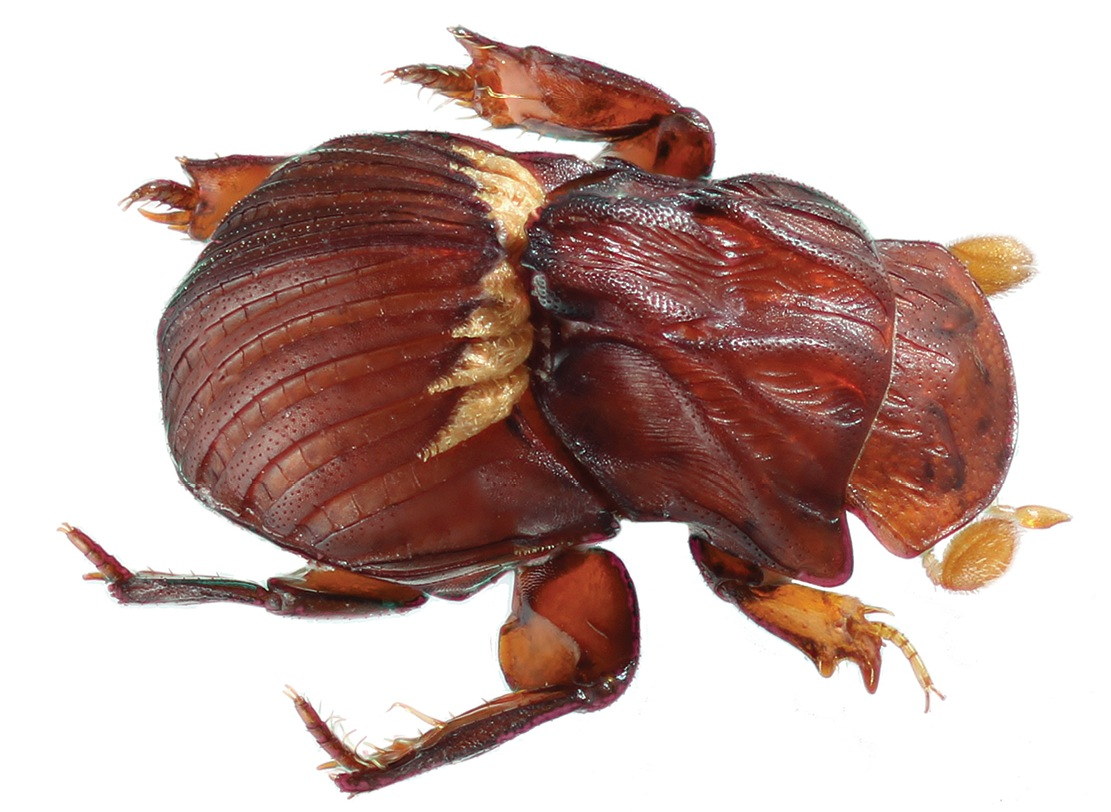
Termitotrox cupido

Termitophiles are macro-organisms adapted to live in association with termites or their nests. They include vertebrates, invertebrates and fungi and can either be obligate termitophiles (those that cannot live without the termites) or non-obligate termitophiles (those that can live independently and make use of the termite nests facultatively or opportunistically). Termitophiles may spend a just a part or the whole of their lifecycle inside a termite nest. The term termitariophily has been suggested as a term to describe the situation where a foreign organism merely uses the termite nest.

Termites live in colonies and construct nests whose environments are controlled. The temperature, humidity, and other conditions inside the nests may be more favourable than the outdoor environment for the termitophiles while potentially also making use of the food resources within the nest, including the fungi grown by the colony or the eggs or larvae being reared.

Termitophilous insects avoid the defenses of the termite colony through one or more of a number of adaptations including having a rounded and smooth body, having bristles (often yellow) on their body surface, masking their odor to avoid detection, exuding chemicals from their body that the termites find pleasing, or by appearing like inanimate objects or mimicking termites.

== Insects ==
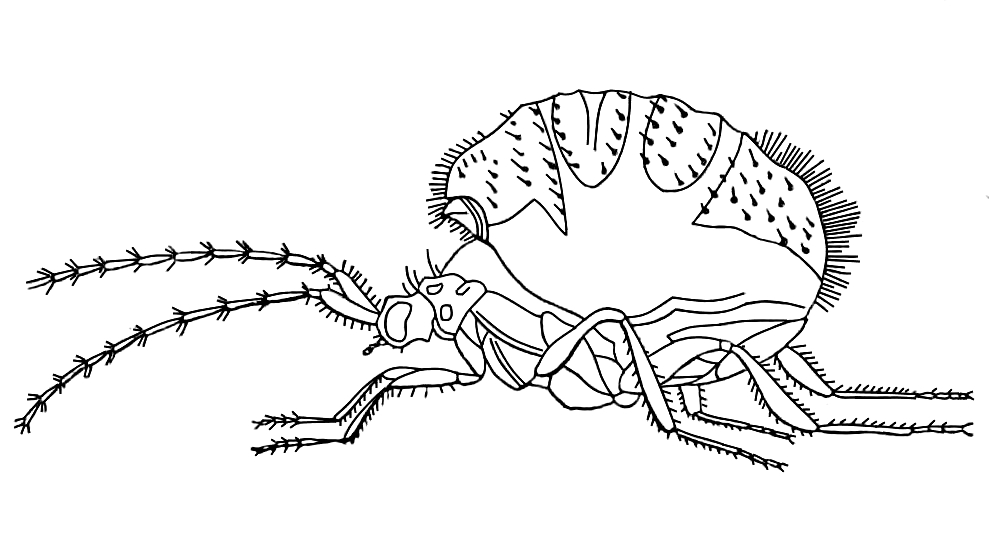
Corotoca melantho, a termitophilous rove beetle

A number of species of staphylinid beetles are known to be termitophiles. Cretotrichopsenius burmiticus has been described from 99 million year old Burmese amber and shows termitophilous adaptations. Some like Trichopsenius frosti and Xenistusa hexagonalis are known to follow the trail pheromones of their termite host Reticulitermes virginicus. Trichopsenius frosti also has a cuticular hydrocarbon profile closely matching that of its host. Staphylinid termitophiles mostly in the subfamily Aleocharinae curl their abdomen over their body. The abdomen may also show enlargement of physogastry and in a few species there are protruding appendages that mimic the body structure of a termite. The Australian species Austrospirachtha mimetes and Austrospirachtha carrijoi have abdomen resembling termites. Similar adaptations are seen in the South American Thyreoxenus alakazam and the African Coatonachthodes ovambolandicus.

A subfamily of scarab beetles, the Termitotroginae, are small, blind, and with reduced antennae. The genus Termitotrox (includes Aphodiocopris) is known from the fungus combs of termites in India and Africa. They are thought to be obligate termitophiles.

Some flies in the family Phoridae are termitophilous and grow as larvae within the termite nests. Some species have larvae that feed on the fungus comb while others are termite endoparasites or predators.

== Fungi ==
Termite nest specific fungi include the Basidiobolus, Antennopsis, and some species of Xylaria. Several species of Termitomyces are grown intentionally as food by termites within their comb.

== See also ==
- Myrmecophiles
- Symphiles
- Inquiline
