= List of Marasmiaceae genera =

The Marasmiaceae are a family of fungi in the order Agaricales. It includes over 50 genera and some 1590 species.

== Genera ==
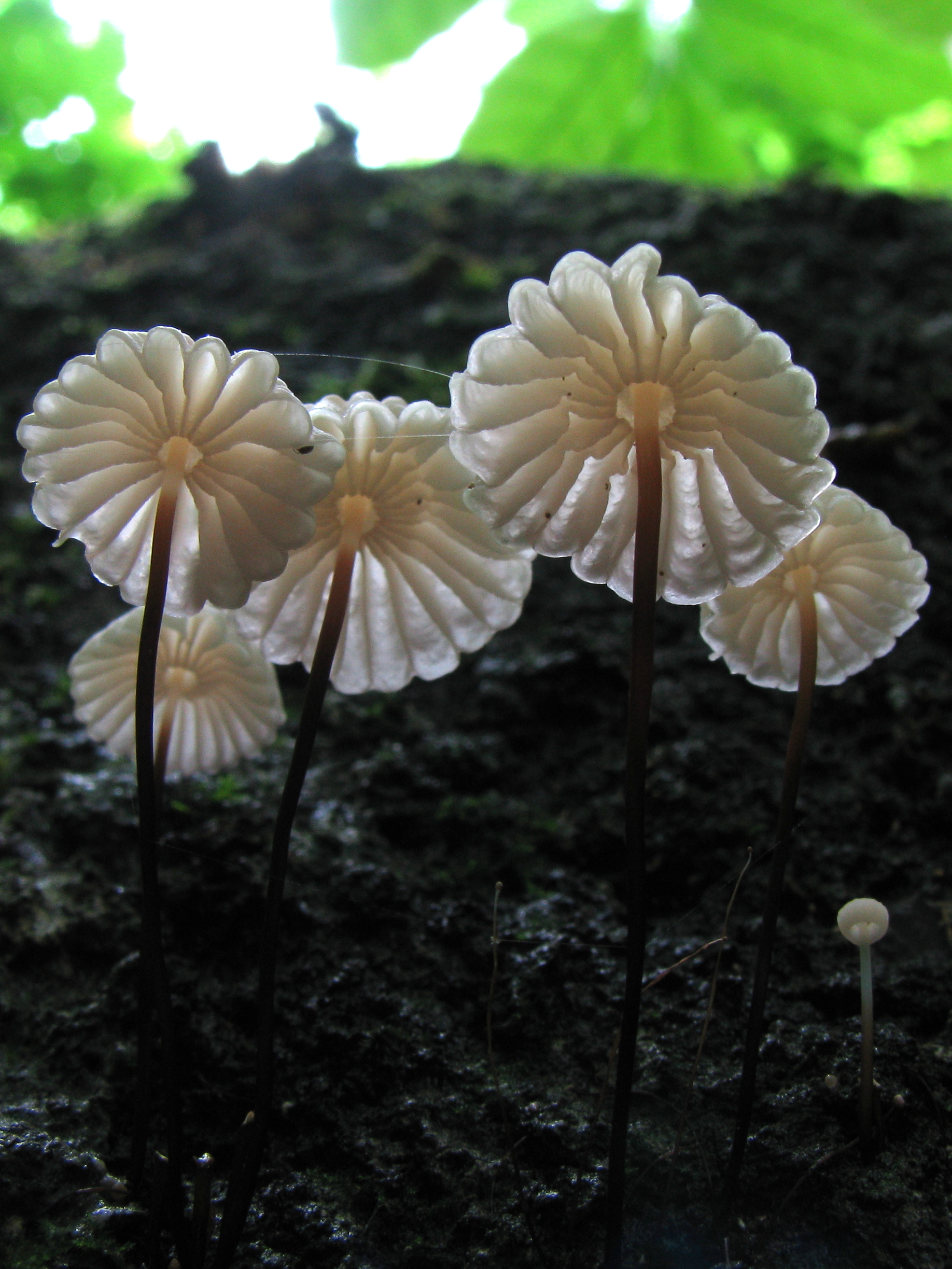
Marasmius rotula

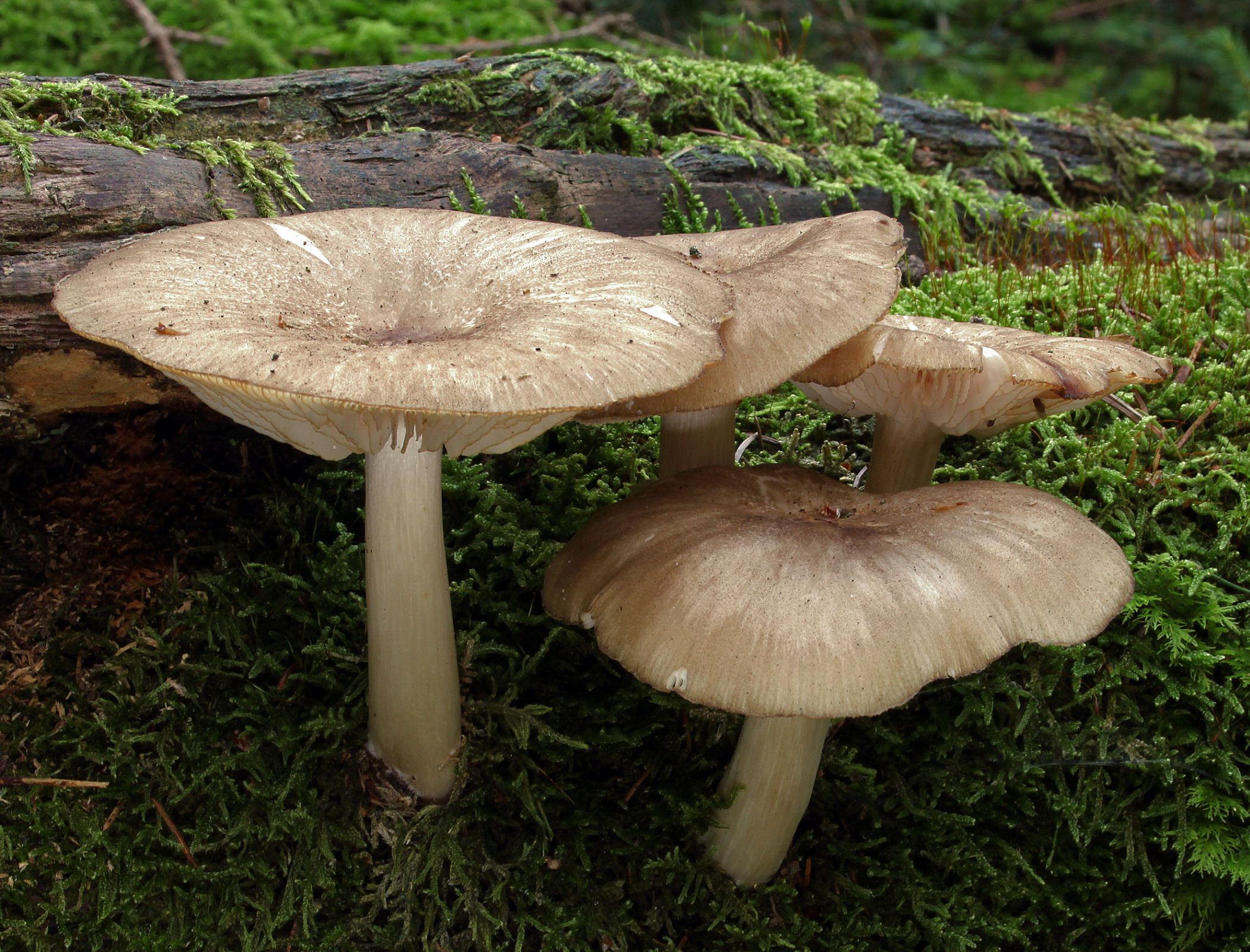
Megacollybia platyphylla

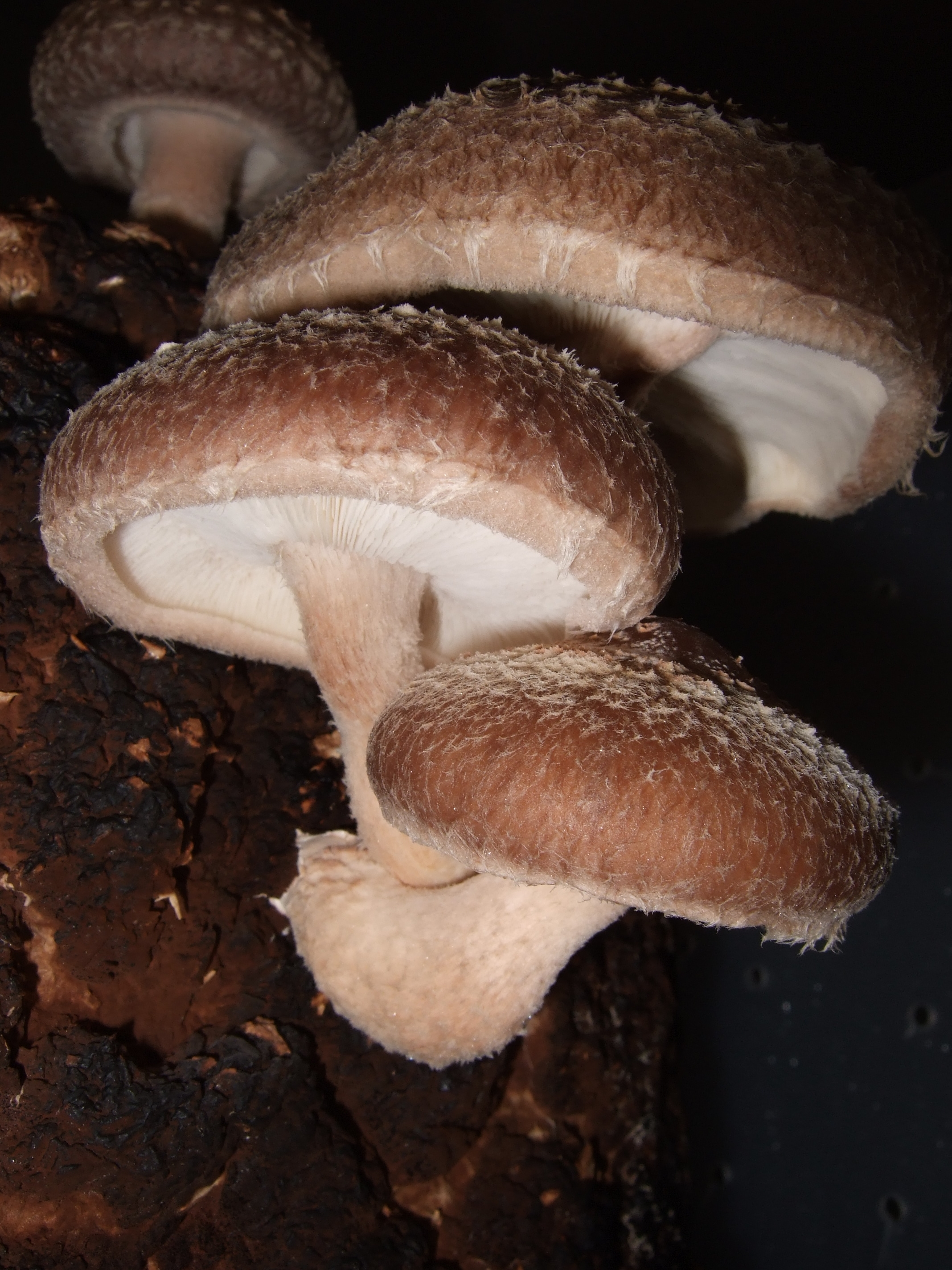
Lentinula edodes

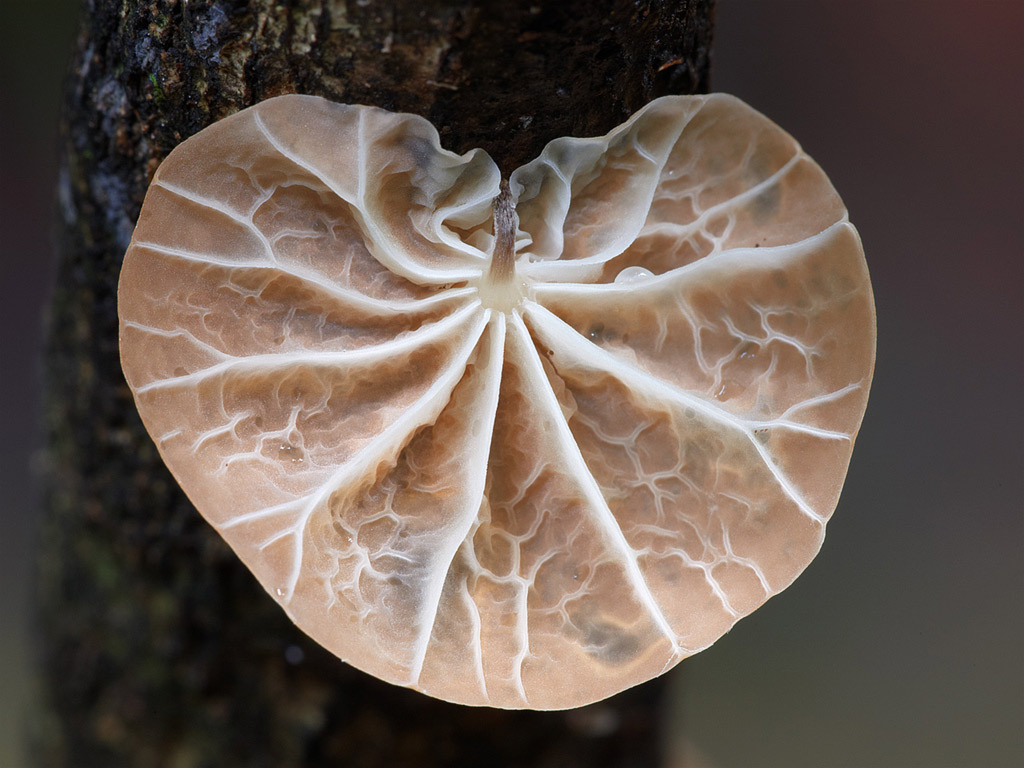
Campanella sp.

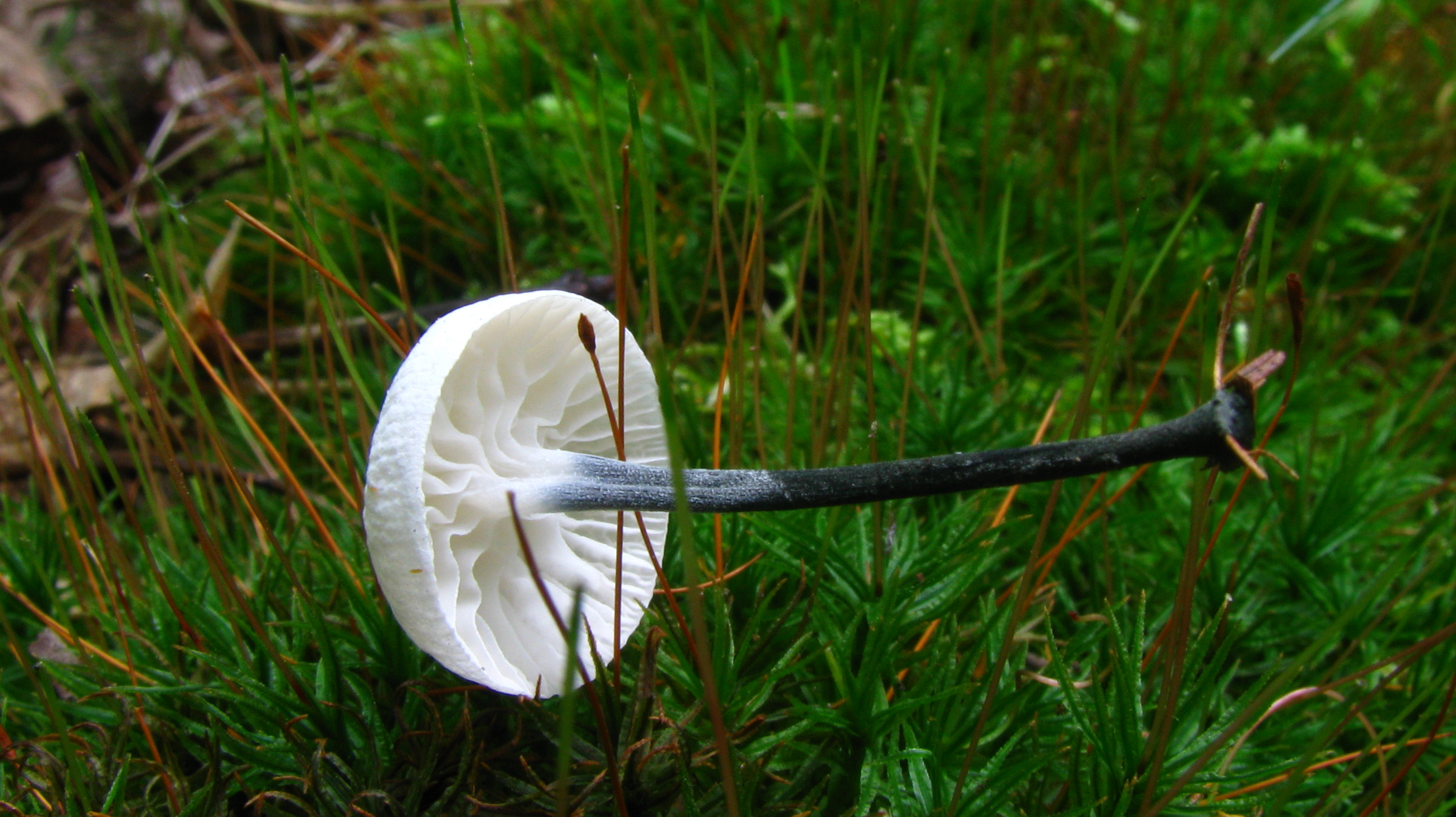
Tetrapyrgos nigripes

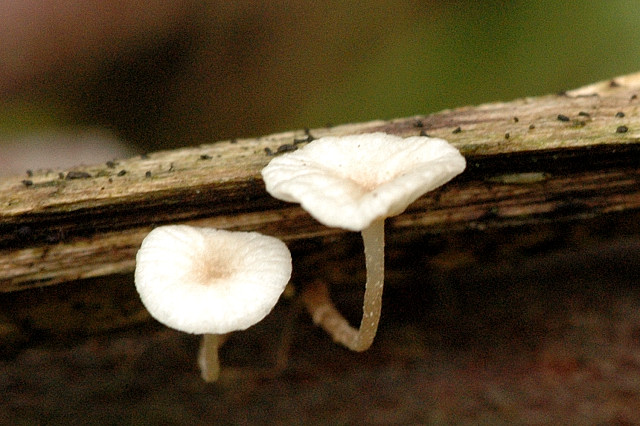
Marasmiellus ramealis

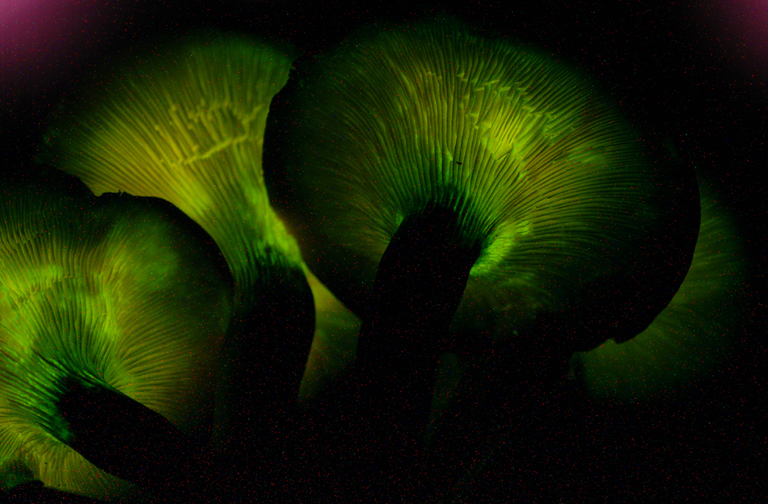
Omphalotus olearius

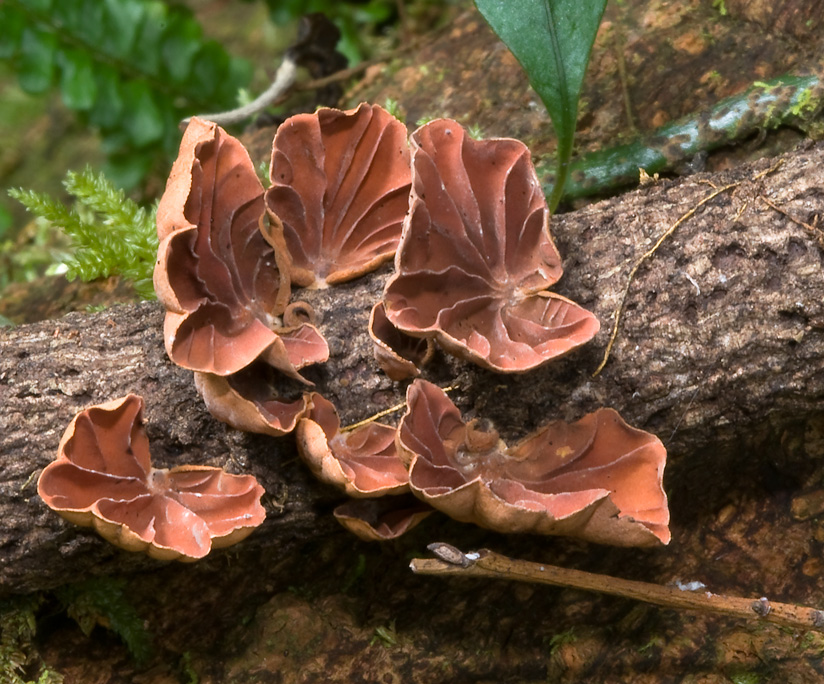
Anthracophyllum archeri

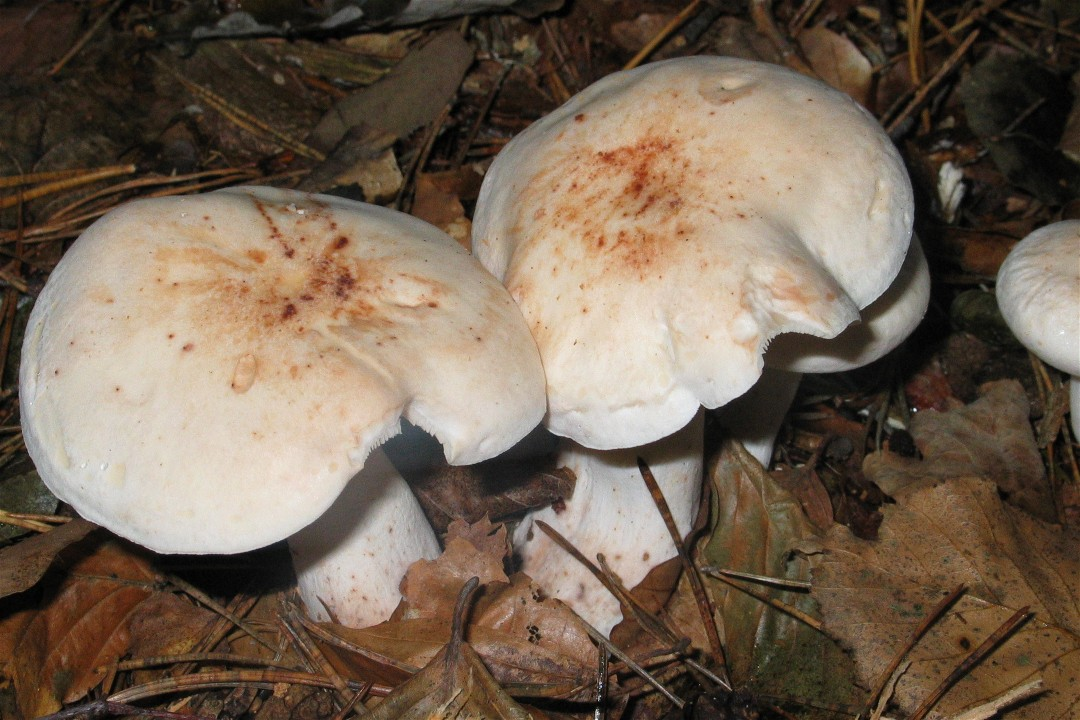
Rhodocollybia maculata

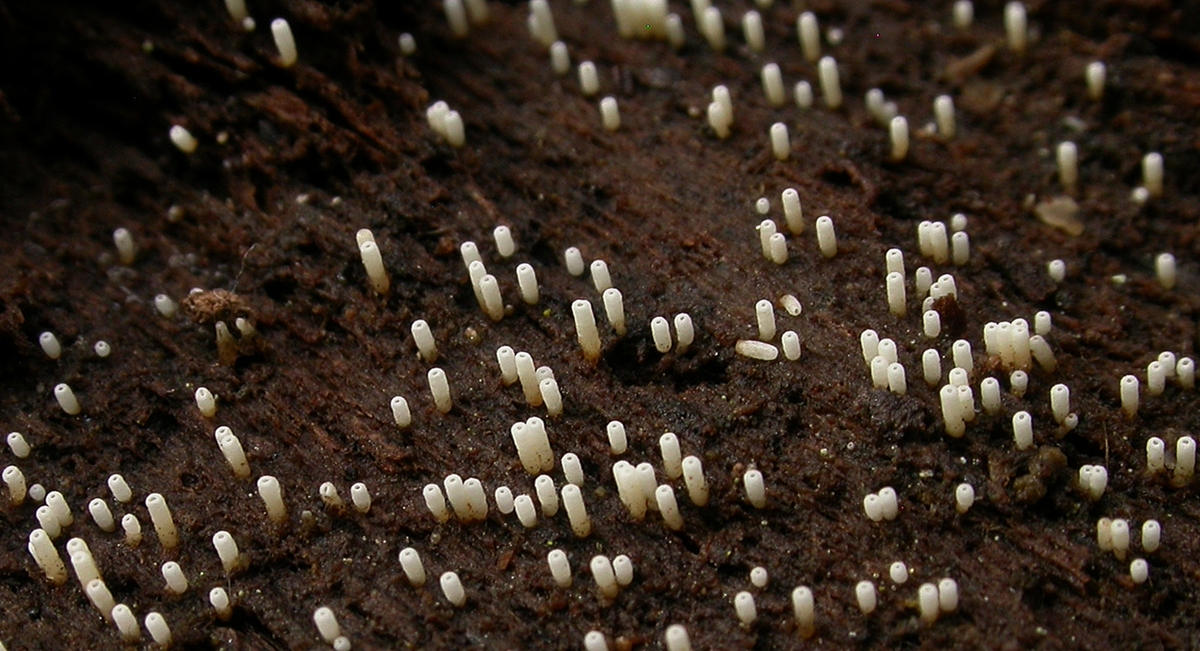
Henningsomyces candidus

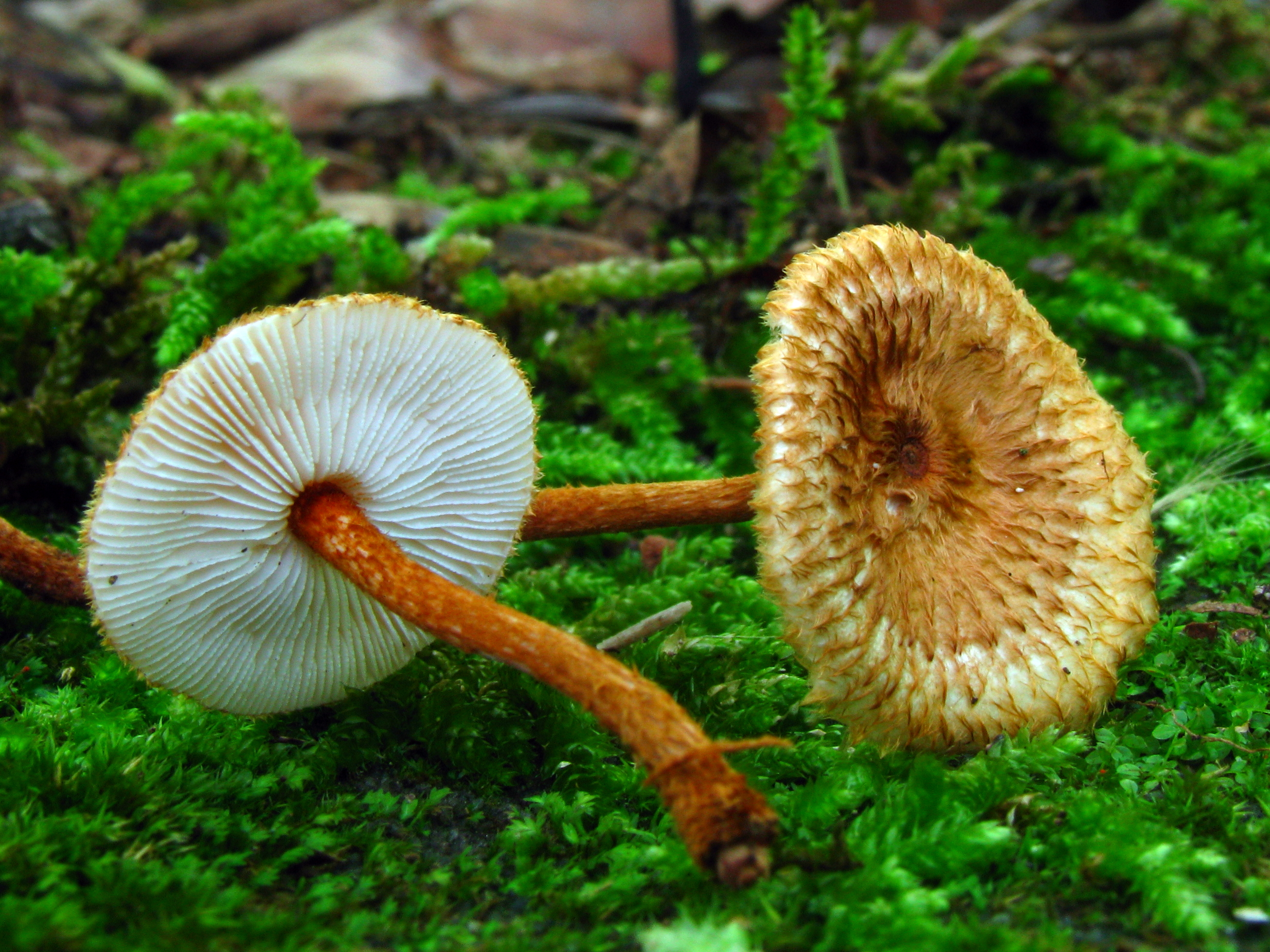
Crinipellis zonata

Genus	Year	Type species	# of species	Distribution
Amyloflagellula; Singer	1908	Amyloflagellula pulchra (Berk. & Broome) Singer	4	Asia, Neotropics
Anastrophella; E.Horak & Desjardin	1994	Anastrophella subpeltata (Redhead) E.Horak & Desjardin	3	New Zealand, Japan, Hawaii
Anthracophyllum; Ces.	1879	Anthracophyllum beccarianum Ces.	10	Tropical Asia and America
Aphyllotus; Singer	1974 ("1973") (Note: Conventional mean to indicate that the taxonomic date of publication for the purpose of priority is different from the date given by the work itself.)	Aphyllotus campanelliformis Singer	1	Colombia
Baeospora; Singer	1938	Baeospora myosura (Fr.:Fr.) Singer	10	Worldwide
Calathella (Note: This illegitimate name is a later homonym of a genus of fossil algae (Florin, Senckenbergiana 11:241–266, 1929). The genus also appears to be polyphyletic, but the affinities of its type species are currently unknown, leaving its final placement uncertain (Yamaguchi et al., Mycoscience 50(3)156–164, 2009; Sulzbacher & al., Mycotaxon 105:37–42, 2008).); D.A.Reid	1964	Calathella eruciformis (P.Micheli ex Batsch) D.A.Reid	9	Europe, North America
Calyptella; Quél.	1886	Calyptella capula (Holmsk.) Quél.	20	Cosmopolitan
Campanella; Henn.	1895	Campanella buettneri Henn.	~40	Cosmopolitan, but mostly tropical
Caripia; Kuntze	1898	Caripia montagnei (Berk.) Kuntze	1	Neotropical
Cephaloscypha; Agerer	1975 ("1974")	Cephaloscypha morlichensis (W.B.Cooke) Agerer	1	Worldwide
Chaetocalathus; Singer	1943	Chaetocalathus craterellus (Durieu & Lév.) Singer	~20	Mostly subtropical
Clitocybula (Singer) Singer ex Métrod	1952	Clitocybula lacerata (Scopoli) Singer ex Métrod	~15	Cosmopolitan in temperate areas
Connopus; R.H.Petersen	2010	Connopus acervatus (Fr.:Fr.) R.H.Petersen	1	Europe, North America
Crinipellis; Pat.	1889	Crinipellis stipitaria (Note: This species' type is now considered to fall within Crinipellis scabella.) (Fr.:Fr.) Pat.	~75	Worldwide, mostly tropical
Cymatella; Pat.	1899	Cymatella minima Pat.	4	Antilles
Cymatellopsis; Parmasto	1985 ("1984")	Cymatellopsis ilmiana	1	Africa
Deigloria; Agerer	1980	Deigloria pulchella Agerer	10	Neotropical
Epicnaphus; Singer	1960	Epicnaphus phalaropus Singer	3	South America
Fissolimbus; E.Horak	1979	Fissolimbus fallaciosus E.Horak	1	Papua New Guinea
Gerronema; Singer	1951	Gerronema melanomphax	13	Cosmopolitan, but mostly subtropical
Glabrocyphella; W.B.Cooke	1961	Glabrocyphella palmarum (Berk. & M.A.Curtis) W.B.Cooke	13	Cosmopolitan
Gymnopus (Note: The former proposed genus Setulipes is now incorporated into Gymnopus (though some name combinations may remain to be correctly defined). Even Antonín, the author of Setulipes, agrees with this change (see Antonín, Vladimír; Noordeloos, Machiel E. (2010). A monograph of marasmioid fungi and collybioid fungi in Europe. Postfach 1119, D-85378 Eching, Germany: IHW Verlag. pp. 14–16. ISBN 978-3-930167-72-2.)) (Pers.) Roussel	1806	Gymnopus fusipes (Bull.) Gray	~300	Cosmopolitan
Henningsomyces (Note: A replacement name for Solenia Pers. (Neues Mag. Bot. 1:116, 1796), a quasi homonym of the small Cucurbitaceae genus Solena Lour. (Fl. Cochinch. 2:514, 1790).); Kuntze	1898	Henningsomyces candidus (Per.:Fr.) Kuntze	~20	Cosmopolitan
Hispidocalyptella; E.Horak & Desjardin	1994	Hispidocalyptella australis E.Horak & Desjardin	1	Australia
Hydropus; Singer	1948	Hydropus fuliginarius (Batsch) Singer	~100	Mostly tropical
Hymenogloea; Pat.	1900	Hymenogloea riofrioi (Pat.) Pat.	1	Tropical Americas
Lactocollybia; Singer	1939 ("1938")	Lactocollybia lacrimosa (R.Heim) Singer	17	Primarily tropical
Lecanocybe; Desjardin & E.Horak	1999	Lecanocybe lateralis Desjardin & E.Horak	1	Java, Hawaii
Lentinula; Earle	1909 ("1906")	Lentinula cubensis (Note: A synonym of Lentinula boryana.) (Berk. & M.A.Curtis) Earle	3/5 (Note: Depending on the circumscription of Asian species.)	East Asia, North and Central America
Macrocystidia; Joss.	1934 ("1933")	Macrocysitidia cucumis (Pers.:Fr.) Joss.	5	Worldwide
Manuripia; Singer	1960	Manuripia bifida Singer	1	Bolivia
Marasmiellus; Murrill	1915	Marasmiellus juniperinus Murrill	~250	Cosmopolitan
Marasmius; Fr.	1836 ("1835")	Marasmius rotula (Scop.:Fr.) Fr.	~500	Worldwide
Megacollybia; Kotl.	1972	Megacollybia platyphylla (Pers.:Fr.) Kotl. & Pouzar	8+	Europe, Eastern North America
Metulocyphella; Agerer	1983	Metulocyphella lanceolata Agerer	2	South America
Moniliophthora; H.C.Evans & al.	1978	Moniliophthora roreri (Cif.) H.C.Evans & al.	~10	Tropical
Mycetinis; Earle	1909	Mycetinis alliaceus (Jacq.:Fr.) Earle	≥8	Worldwide
Neocampanella; Nakasone et al.	2009	Neocampanella blastanos (Boidin & Gilles) Nakasone et al.	1	Réunion, Puerto Rico, Central African Republic
Neonothopanus; R.H.Petersen & Krisai	1999	Neonothopanus nambi (Speg.) R.H.Petersen & Krisai	1	South America
Nochascypha; Agerer	1983	Nochascypha filicina (P.Karst.) Agerer	6	South America
Nothopanus; Singer	1944	Nothopanus eugrammus (Mont.) Singer	2	Worldwide, mostly tropical
Omphalotus; Fayod	1889	Omphalotus olearius (DC.:Fr.) Singer	5	Cosmopolitan
Palaeocephala (Note: The placement of this genus within Agaricales is not entirely clear. It might belong in the Physalacriaceae.); Singer	1962 ("1961")	Phaeodepas dennisii (Dennis & D.A.Reid) Singer	1	Sierra Leone
Phaeodepas; D.A.Reid	1961	Phaeodepas dennisii D.A.Reid	2	Venezuela
Pleurocybella; Singer	1947	Pleurocybella porrigens (Pers.:Fr.) Singer	1	Worldwide, northern temperate
Pseudotyphula; Corner	1953	Pseudotyphula ochracea Corner	1	North America
Rectipilus; Agerer	1973	Rectipilus fascinculatus (Pers.:Fr.) Agerer	9	Cosmopolitan
Rhodocollybia; Singer	1939 ("1938")	Rhodocollybia maculata (Alb. & Schwein.:Fr.) Singer	~30	Americas, Europe
Skepperiella; Pilát	1927	Skepperiella spathularia (Berk. & M.A.Curtis) Pilát	4	Cosmopolitan
Stipitocyphella (Note: Because the type appears to remain in the author's private collection, it is not clear whether the publication is considered valid under the International Code of Botanical Nomenclature.); G.Kost	1998	Stipitocyphella kenyensis G. Kost	1	East Africa
Stromatocyphella; W.B.Cooke	1961	Stromatocyphella conglobata (Burt) W.B.Cooke	3	North America
Tetrapyrgos (Note: A replacement name for Georges Métrod's Pterospora (Les Mycènes de Madagascar:129, 1949), which was already in use as Pterospora Nutt. (Gen. N. Amer. Pl. 1:269, 1818).); E.Horak	1987	Tetrapyrgos atrocyanea (Métrod) E.Horak	16	Worldwide, mostly tropical
Trogia; Fr.	1836	Trogia aplorutis (Mont.) Fr.	~20	Widespread, mostly tropical

== Notes and references ==
Notes

== See also ==
- List of Agaricales families
- List of Agaricales genera
