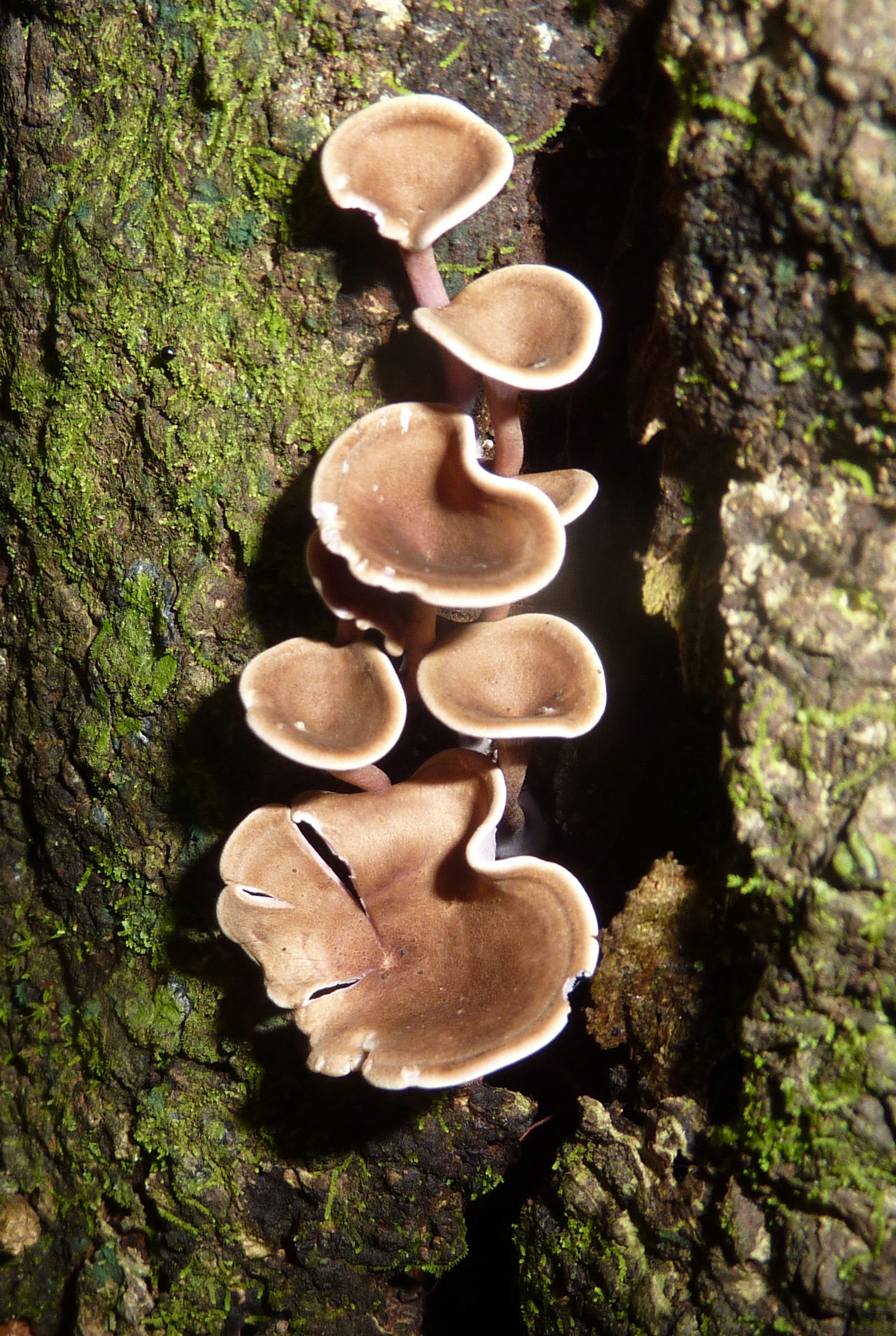
- Trogia cantharelloides, Panama

Scientific classification
- Domain: Eukaryota
- Kingdom: Fungi
- Division: Basidiomycota
- Class: Agaricomycetes
- Order: Agaricales
- Family: Tricholomataceae
- Genus: Trogia; Fr. (1835)

Type species
- Trogia aplorutis (Mont.) Fr. (1835)

Species
- see text

= Trogia =

Genus of fungi

Trogia is a genus of fungi in the family Marasmiaceae. It is named after a Swiss mycologist Jacob Gabriel Trog. The genus contains about 20 species that are widely distributed in tropical areas.

== Taxonomy ==
The genus was first circumscribed by Elias Magnus Fries in 1835. He set the type species as Trogia montagnei, a species that had been described by French mycologist Camille Montagne in 1834 as Cantharellus aplorutis. The type has since been lost, and as a result, there has been some historical disagreement as to the boundaries of the genus. The British botanist Edred John Henry Corner emended the genus in 1966 to include 56 species. Rolf Singer disagreed with this broad species concept in the fourth edition of his Agaricales in Modern Taxonomy (1986), and only included three species: T. cantharelloides, T. buccinalis, and T. montagnei. He considered most of the species included by Corner as better placed in genera like Hemimycena, Mycena, Gerronema, Hydropus, and Hymenogloea. Corner later defended his species concept in a 1991 publication.

== Description ==
The genus contains species with clitocyboid (gilled mushrooms that lack partial veils and feature white, yellowish, or pinkish spore prints) to omphalinoid (mushroom with a decurrent gill attachment, a cartilage-like stem, a broad or depressed cap surface and lacking a ring and volva) fruit body types. The fruit bodies are tough when dry, but can revive when moistened. They grow on rotting wood or woody material.

== Distribution ==
Species in the genus are found in tropical and subtropical areas. Trogia cantharelloides (Mont.) Pat. is a widespread neotropical species, recorded from Puerto Rico, and Cuba among other places.

== Uses ==
As a wood-rotting fungus genus, species of Trogia have enzymes that break down lignin, a complex polysaccharide that is largely responsible for giving wood its strength. Trogia buccinalis has been investigated for its ability to use these enzymes to break down common pollutant molecules such as anthracene, pentachlorophenol, and polyvinylchloride.

== Yunnan Sudden Death Syndrome ==
One species, Trogia venenata, colloquially known as "little white" has been implicated in the deaths of around 400 people in Yunnan province, southwestern China. Appearing after local rainfall, the mushrooms contain toxic amino acids and seem to be cardiotoxic in susceptible people, causing fatal arrhythmia. The amino acids are not used in proteins, and one is new to science, According to taxonomist Yang Zhuliang, Trogia was not previously thought to contain poisonous species. A team led by Chinese Center for Disease Control and Prevention epidemiologist Zeng Guang suggested that the element barium, present in local foods and contaminated water, may increase the toxicity of the Trogia mushroom. This has been disproved by later studies.

== Species ==
The 10th edition of the Dictionary of the Fungi (2008) estimated there were about 20 species in the genus. As of September 2015, Index Fungorum list 74 valid species in the genus.

- Trogia alba
- Trogia aphylla
- Trogia aplorutis
- Trogia aquosa
- Trogia aurantiphylla
- Trogia borneoensis
- Trogia brevipes
- Trogia buccinalis
- Trogia calyculus
- Trogia cantharelloides
- Trogia carminea
- Trogia caryotae
- Trogia ceraceomollis
- Trogia cervina
- Trogia cinerea
- Trogia crinipelliformis
- Trogia cyanea
- Trogia delicata
- Trogia diminutiva
- Trogia exigua
- Trogia fuliginea
- Trogia fulvochracea
- Trogia furcata
- Trogia fuscoalba
- Trogia fuscolutea
- Trogia fuscomellea
- Trogia ghesquierei
- Trogia grisea
- Trogia hispidula
- Trogia holochlora
- Trogia icterina
- Trogia impartita
- Trogia inaequalis
- Trogia lilaceogrisea
- Trogia limonosporoides
- Trogia macra
- Trogia mammillata
- Trogia mellea
- Trogia mycenoides
- Trogia nigrescens
- Trogia nitrosa
- Trogia ochrophylla
- Trogia octava
- Trogia odorata
- Trogia omphalinoides
- Trogia pallida
- Trogia papillata
- Trogia papyracea (now reclassified as Hymenogloea riofrioi)
- Trogia pleurotoides
- Trogia polyadelpha
- Trogia primulina
- Trogia raphanolens
- Trogia revoluta
- Trogia rivulosa
- Trogia rosea
- Trogia rubida
- Trogia seriflua
- Trogia silvae-araucariae
- Trogia silvestris
- Trogia straminea
- Trogia subdistans
- Trogia subgelatinosa
- Trogia subglobospora
- Trogia sublateralis
- Trogia subrufescens
- Trogia subtomentosa
- Trogia subtranslucens
- Trogia subviridis
- Trogia tenax
- Trogia tricholomatoides
- Trogia umbonata
- Trogia umbrinoalba
- Trogia venenata
- Trogia violaceogrisea

== See also ==
- List of Marasmiaceae genera
