= Fissolimbus =

Scientific classification
- Kingdom: Fungi
- Division: Basidiomycota
- Class: Agaricomycetes
- Order: Agaricales
- Family: Marasmiaceae
- Genus: Fissolimbus; E.Horak (1979)
- Species: F. fallaciosus

Binomial name
- Fissolimbus fallaciosus E.Horak (1979)

Monotypic genus of fungi

Fissolimbus is a fungal genus in the family Marasmiaceae. This is a monotypic genus, containing the single species Fissolimbus fallaciosus, which is found in Papua New Guinea. The genus and species were described as new to science in 1979.

== See also ==
- List of Agaricales genera
- List of Marasmiaceae genera
