= Aphyllotus =

Scientific classification
- Kingdom: Fungi
- Division: Basidiomycota
- Class: Agaricomycetes
- Order: Agaricales
- Family: Marasmiaceae
- Genus: Aphyllotus; Singer (1973)

Type species
- Aphyllotus campanelliformis Singer (1973)

Genus of fungi

Aphyllotus is a fungal genus in the family Marasmiaceae. This is a monotypic genus, containing the single species Aphyllotus campanelliformis, found in Colombia. Both the species and the genus were described by mycologist Rolf Singer in 1973.

== See also ==
- List of Agaricales genera
- List of Marasmiaceae genera
