= Hispidocalyptella =

Scientific classification
- Kingdom: Fungi
- Division: Basidiomycota
- Class: Agaricomycetes
- Order: Agaricales
- Family: Marasmiaceae
- Genus: Hispidocalyptella; E.Horak & Desjardin

Type species
- Hispidocalyptella australis E.Horak & Desjardin

Genus of fungi

Hispidocalyptella is a genus of fungus in the family Marasmiaceae. This is a monotypic genus, containing the single species Hispidocalyptella australis, found in Australia.

== See also ==
- List of Marasmiaceae genera
