= Deigloria =

Scientific classification
- Kingdom: Fungi
- Division: Basidiomycota
- Class: Agaricomycetes
- Order: Agaricales
- Family: Marasmiaceae
- Genus: Deigloria; Agerer (1980)

Type species
- Deigloria pulchella Agerer (1980)

Species
- D. amoena D. modesta D. paraguayensis D. pulchella D. pulcherrima

Genus of fungi

Deigloria is a genus of agaric fungus in the family Marasmiaceae. Described by mycologist Reinhard Agerer in 1980, the genus contains 10 species that are widespread in neotropical areas. The generic name derives from the Latin words Deus (God) and gloria (glory).

== See also ==
- List of Agaricales genera
- List of Marasmiaceae genera
