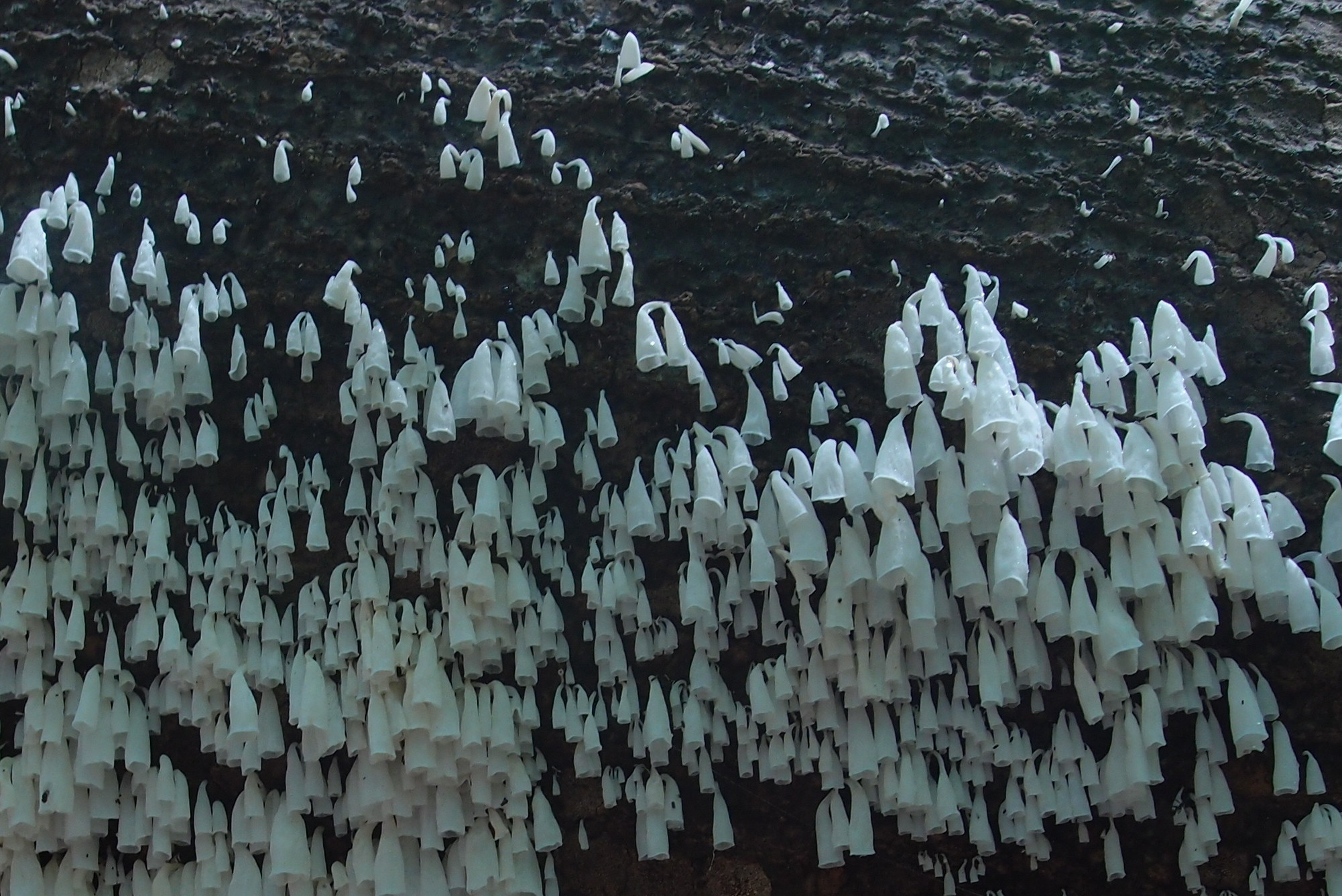
- Calyptella longipes

Scientific classification
- Kingdom: Fungi
- Division: Basidiomycota
- Class: Agaricomycetes
- Order: Agaricales
- Family: Marasmiaceae
- Genus: Calyptella; Quél. (1886)

Type species
- Calyptella capula (Holmsk.) Quél. (1888)

= Calyptella =

Genus of fungi

Calyptella is a genus of Cyphelloid fungi in the family Marasmiaceae. The genus has a widespread distribution and contains 20 species.

These fungi grow on bark of trees or on the stems of herbaceous plants (generally when they are already dead). The fruiting bodies are shaped like bells which hang down from a point of attachment, sometimes with short stems. The smooth fertile surface is on the interior of the bell shape.

== Species ==
- Calyptella australis
- Calyptella bakeriana
- Calyptella bonairensis
- Calyptella campanula
- Calyptella capula
- Calyptella crateriformis
- Calyptella cystidiosa
- Calyptella epibrya
- Calyptella flava
- Calyptella hebes
- Calyptella longipes
- Calyptella musae
- Calyptella nabambissoënsis
- Calyptella pteridophytorum
- Calyptella puiggarii
- Calyptella totara
- Calyptella urbanii

== See also ==
- List of Marasmiaceae genera
