= Stipitocyphella =

Scientific classification
- Kingdom: Fungi
- Division: Basidiomycota
- Class: Agaricomycetes
- Order: Agaricales
- Family: Marasmiaceae
- Genus: Stipitocyphella; G.Kost (1998)

Type species
- Stipitocyphella keniensis G.Kost (1998)

Genus of fungi

Stipitocyphella is a fungal genus in the family Marasmiaceae. It is a monotypic genus, containing the single species Stipitocyphella keniensis, from Kenya.

== See also ==
- List of Marasmiaceae genera
