= Trogia venenata =

Scientific classification
- Kingdom: Fungi
- Division: Basidiomycota
- Class: Agaricomycetes
- Order: Agaricales
- Family: Tricholomataceae
- Genus: Trogia
- Species: T. venenata

Binomial name
- Trogia venenata Zhu L.Yang, Y.C.Li & L.P.Tang (2012)

Species of toxic fungus in the family Marasmiaceae indigenous to Yunnan province

Trogia venenata
- Mycological characteristics
- Gills on hymenium
- Ecology is saprotrophic
- Edibility is deadly

Trogia venenata, also known as the little white mushroom, is a species of fungus in the family Marasmiaceae indigenous to Yunnan province, in southwest China. Consumption is deadly for both humans and mice, as the mushroom contains three toxic amino acids.

This is the presumed cause of Yunnan sudden death syndrome.

In December 2012 it was announced that Dr. Xu Jianping (徐建平) has been collecting samples of Trogia venenata in Yunnan for the past three years, and his research now shows that barium (previously thought to be the cause) levels in the wild mushroom are no higher than those of common foods such as poultry and fish.

Nonetheless, it appears the mushroom will still likely play a role. Since publication of the widely circulated 2010 Science article, no instances of Yunnan sudden death syndrome have been reported.

== See also ==
- List of deadly fungus species
- Mushroom poisoning
