= Pseudotyphula =

Scientific classification
- Kingdom: Fungi
- Division: Basidiomycota
- Class: Agaricomycetes
- Order: Agaricales
- Family: Marasmiaceae
- Genus: Pseudotyphula; Corner (1953)

Type species
- Pseudotyphula ochracea Corner (1953)

Genus of fungi

Pseudotyphula is a genus of fungus in the family Marasmiaceae. The genus is monotypic, containing the single species Pseudotyphula ochracea, found in North America. The genus was circumscribed by British mycologist E.J.H. Corner in 1953.

== See also ==
- List of Marasmiaceae genera
