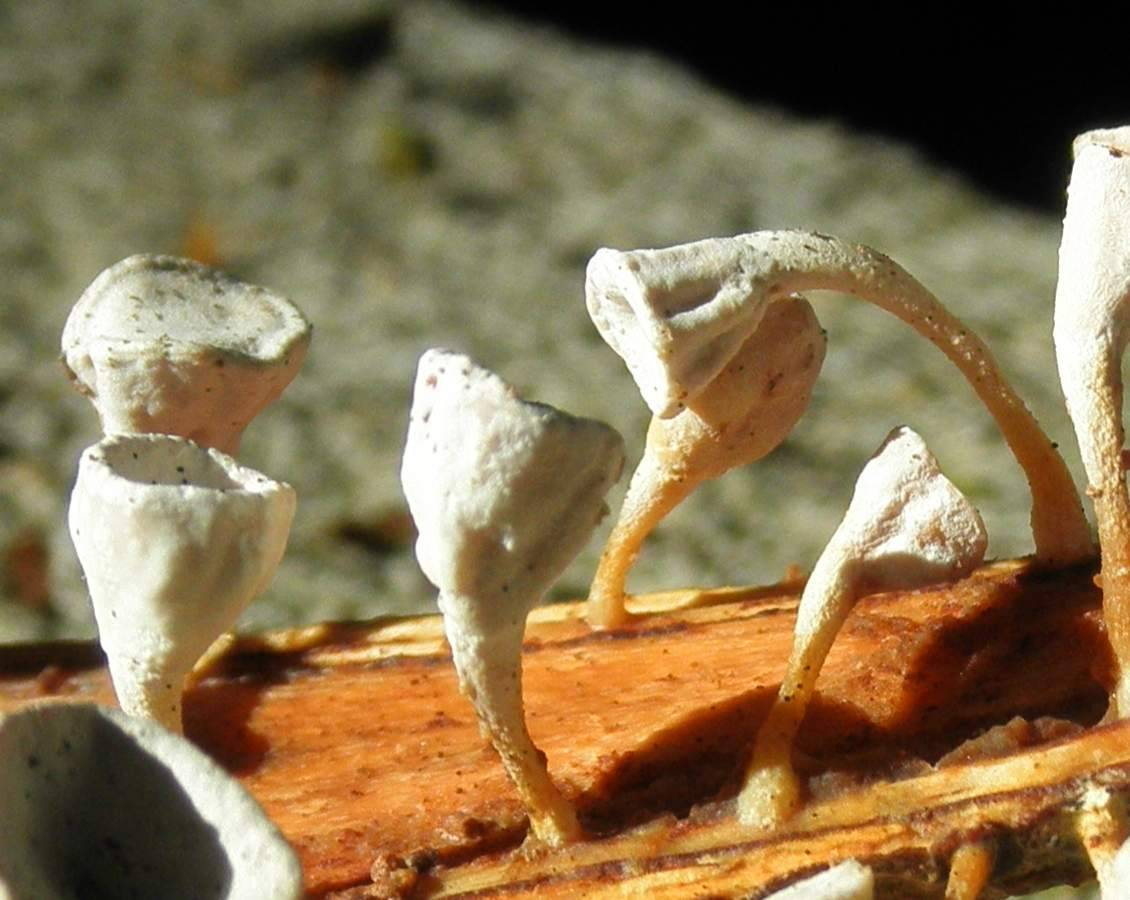

Scientific classification
- Kingdom: Fungi
- Division: Basidiomycota
- Class: Agaricomycetes
- Order: Agaricales
- Family: Marasmiaceae
- Genus: Caripia; Kuntze (1898)

Type species
- Caripia montagnei (Berk.) Kuntze (1898)

Synonyms
- Hypolyssus montagnei Berk. (1842)

= Caripia =

Genus of fungi

Caripia is a fungal genus in the family Marasmiaceae. The genus is monotypic, containing the single species Caripia montagnei, commonly known as the pod parachute. It is found in tropical and subtropical regions of the Americas. Formerly classified in the Stereales (a now obsolete order that has been merged into the Russulales), molecular analysis published in 2002 demonstrated that the fungus is a reduced form of the closely related Gymnopus.

== Taxonomy ==
The genus Caripia was circumscribed by Otto Kuntze in 1898 to contain Hypolyssus montagnei, a species originally described by Miles Joseph Berkeley in 1842. Berkeley obtained the original specimens from Camille Montagne, who collected them from Guyana. Kuntze did not elaborate on the characteristics of the genus, instead referring to Pier Andrea Saccardo's description of Hypolyssus in the 6th volume of his 1888 publication Sylloge Fungorum. In 1953, the proposal to conserve the generic name Hypolyssus vs. Caripia was rejected by the Special Committee for Fungi. Other generic names that have been applied to the fungus are Podostrombium, published invalidly by Otto Kuntze in 1828, Heringia, published invalidly by Lewis David de Schweinitz in 1853, and Christian Hendrik Persoon's 1828 Perona.

The generic name Caripia refers to the Caripi River in northern Brazil. The mushroom is commonly known as the "pod parachute".

== Description ==
The goblet or pod-shaped fruit bodies of Caripia montagnei are up to 25 mm (1.0 in) tall with a cap diameter up to 6 mm (0.24 in). The cap margin of young fruit bodies curves slightly inward, but the caps enlarge by intercalary growth between the top of the stipe and the margin, so older specimens develop an obconic (reversed cone) or roughly cylindrical shape with a flattened, and then concave top. The color is whitish to cream, and the surface texture is initially smooth, although the fruit body can develop wrinkles in age. The thin, smooth stipe is brown to purplish brown. The hymenium (spore-bearing tissue) is on the outside surface of the cap, rather than the inside, as is usual for cup-shaped fungi. It grows to about 300 μm thick, and develops irregular surface lumps. The thin-walled spores are narrowly pip-shaped, inamyloid, and measure 5–6 by 2.5–3.3 μm. Another stalked cup fungus, Dumontinia tuberosa (formerly Sclerotinia tuberosa), is vaguely similar in appearance to Caripia montagnei, but it is larger, with cups up to 3 cm (1.2 in) across and stipes up to 10 cm (3.9 in), and the cups are brown.

== Habitat and distribution ==
Caripia montagnei occurs in the woodlands of Central America and South America, where it grows in close groups on branches and sticks of deciduous trees.

== Bioactive compounds ==
The pyridyloxirane compound caripyrin (trans-5-(3-methyloxiranyl)pyridincarboxylic acid methyl ester) was isolated and identified from the fruit bodies of the fungus and reported in 2010. The chemical inhibits the conidial germination and appressorium formation of the rice blast fungus Magnaporthe oryzae. Compared to the structurally related fungal metabolite fusaric acid, it protects plants better, but lacks cytotoxic, antibacterial, and nematicidal activity. Fruit bodies contain polysaccharides that have been shown in laboratory tests to have antiinflammatory properties.

== See also ==
- List of Marasmiaceae genera
