= Manuripia =

Scientific classification
- Kingdom: Fungi
- Division: Basidiomycota
- Class: Agaricomycetes
- Order: Agaricales
- Family: Marasmiaceae
- Genus: Manuripia; Singer (1960)

Type species
- Manuripia bifida Singer (1960)

Genus of fungi

Manuripia is a fungal genus in the family Marasmiaceae. It is a monotypic genus, containing the single species Manuripia bifida, found in South America.

== See also ==
- List of Marasmiaceae genera
