= Anastrophella =

Scientific classification
- Kingdom: Fungi
- Division: Basidiomycota
- Class: Agaricomycetes
- Order: Agaricales
- Family: Marasmiaceae
- Genus: Anastrophella; E. Horak & Desjardin

Type species
- Anastrophella subpeltata (Redhead) E. Horak & Desjardin

Genus of fungi

Anastrophella is a genus of fungi in the family Marasmiaceae.

== Species ==
- A. macrospora E. Horak & Desjardin 1994
- A. podocarpicola Issh. Tanaka
- A. subpeltata (Redhead) E. Horak & Desjardin 1994

== See also ==
- List of Marasmiaceae genera
