= Calathella =

Scientific classification
- Kingdom: Fungi
- Division: Basidiomycota
- Class: Agaricomycetes
- Order: Agaricales
- Family: Marasmiaceae
- Genus: Calathella; D.A. Reid

Type species
- Calathella eruciformis (P. Micheli ex Batsch) D.A. Reid

Species
- C. albolivida C. columbiana C. dichroa C. digitiformis C. ellisii C. eruciformis C. gayana C. mangrovei C. sirindhorniae

Synonyms
- 1951 Flagelloscypha Donk

Genus of fungi

Calathella is a genus of fungi in the mushroom family Marasmiaceae.

== Description ==
The genus contains fungi that produce small tubular or cup-shaped cyphelloid fruit bodies. The fruit bodies are characterized by encrusted surface hairs with rounded tips, uniform basidia (swollen at the base), and spores that range in shape from oblong-elliptical to cylindrical.

== Taxonomy ==
The genus was circumscribed by the English mycologist Derek Reid in 1964. According to the Dictionary of the Fungi (10th edition, 2008), the genus contains nine species found in Europe and North America.

In 2025, a new mangrove-associated species of Calathella was described in Thailand and named C. sirindhorniae after princess Maha Chakri Sirindhorn.

== See also ==
- List of Marasmiaceae genera
