= Phaeodepas =

Scientific classification
- Kingdom: Fungi
- Division: Basidiomycota
- Class: Agaricomycetes
- Order: Agaricales
- Family: Marasmiaceae
- Genus: Phaeodepas; D.A.Reid

Type species
- Phaeodepas dennisii D.A.Reid

Species
- P. dennisii P. nutans

Genus of fungi

Phaeodepas is a genus of fungus in the family Marasmiaceae. The genus contains two species found in Venezuela.

== See also ==
- List of Marasmiaceae genera
