= Lecanocybe =

Scientific classification
- Kingdom: Fungi
- Division: Basidiomycota
- Class: Agaricomycetes
- Order: Agaricales
- Family: Marasmiaceae
- Genus: Lecanocybe; Desjardin & E.Horak

Type species
- Lecanocybe lateralis Desjardin & E.Horak

Genus of fungi

Lecanocybe is a genus of fungus in the mushroom family Marasmiaceae. This is a monotypic genus, containing the single species Lecanocybe lateralis, found in Java and Hawaii.

== See also ==
- List of Marasmiaceae genera
