= Epicnaphus =

Scientific classification
- Kingdom: Fungi
- Division: Basidiomycota
- Class: Agaricomycetes
- Order: Agaricales
- Family: Marasmiaceae
- Genus: Epicnaphus; Singer (1960)

Type species
- Epicnaphus phalaropus Singer (1960)

Species
- E. longispora E. phalaropus

Genus of fungi

Epicnaphus is a genus of mushroom-forming fungi in the family Marasmiaceae. The genus, circumscribed by mycologist Rolf Singer in 1960, contains two species found in South America. Fruitbodies of Epicnaphus species are similar in appearance to those in Marasmius section Sicci, but have a smooth hymenium and broom cells of the Rotalis-type. Singer initially included only the type species, E. phalaropus, which was originally collected from fallen branches in a Bolivian rainforest. The Argentinian species E. longispora was added to the genus by Jörg Raithelhuber in 1973.

== See also ==
- List of Agaricales genera
- List of Marasmiaceae genera
