= Neocampanella =

Scientific classification
- Kingdom: Fungi
- Division: Basidiomycota
- Class: Agaricomycetes
- Order: Agaricales
- Family: Marasmiaceae
- Genus: Neocampanella; Nakasone, Hibbett & Goranova

Type species
- Neocampanella blastanos Nakasone, Hibbett & Goranova

Genus of fungi

Neocampanella is a genus of fungus in the family Marasmiaceae. The genus is monotypic, containing the single species Neocampanella blastanos.

== See also ==
- List of Marasmiaceae genera
