= Cephaloscypha =

Scientific classification
- Kingdom: Fungi
- Division: Basidiomycota
- Class: Agaricomycetes
- Order: Agaricales
- Family: Marasmiaceae
- Genus: Cephaloscypha; Agerer (1975)

Type species
- Cephaloscypha morlichensis (W.B.Cooke) Agerer (1975)

Genus of fungi

Cephaloscypha is a fungal genus in the family Marasmiaceae. This is a monotypic genus, containing the single species Cephaloscypha morlichensis. The genus and species were described by mycologist Reinhard Agerer in 1975.

== See also ==
- List of Agaricales genera
- List of Marasmiaceae genera
