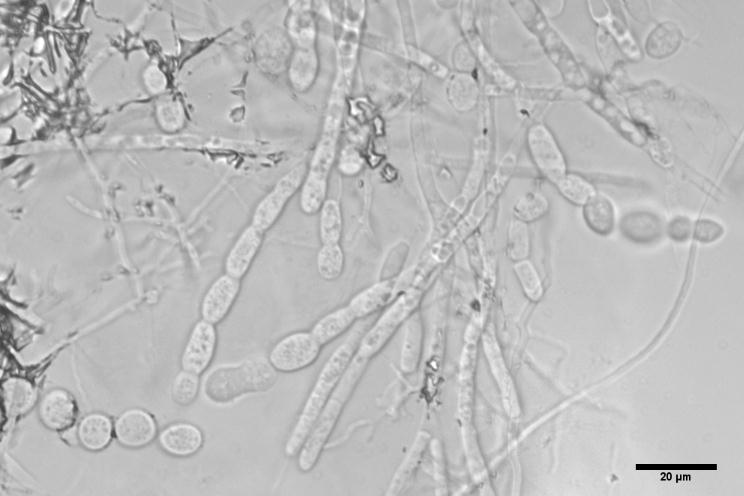

Scientific classification
- Kingdom: Fungi
- Division: Basidiomycota
- Class: Agaricomycetes
- Order: Agaricales
- Family: Marasmiaceae
- Genus: Moniliophthora
- Species: M. roreri

Binomial name
- Moniliophthora roreri (Cif.) H.C. Evans, Stalpers, Samson & Benny, (1978)

Synonyms
- Crinipellis roreri (Cif.) H.C. Evans, (2002); Monilia roreri Cif., (1933)

= Moniliophthora roreri =

Species of fungus

Moniliophthora roreri is a basidiomycete fungus that causes frosty pod rot disease, one of the most serious problems for cacao (Theobroma cacao— the source of chocolate) production in Latin America. This disease and together with witches’ broom disease (caused by M. perniciosa) and black pod rot (caused by Phytophthora sp.) constitute the cacao disease trilogy. It causes serious losses in southwestern parts of South America; spores are dry and powdery and are spread easily by water movement, wind, or movement of pods; disease spread is highest during periods of high rainfall.

== The fungus ==
=== Taxonomy ===
Originally, M. roreri was described as an anamorphic ascomycete, Monilia roreri Cif., due to the absence of a recognizable fruiting body or a sexual stage and other similarities to species of Monilia. Later on it was noticed that the septa of the pathogen contained dolipores and septal pore caps, which are features of basidiomycete fungi. Consequently, Monilia roreri was reclassified and given its current name, Moniliophthora roreri (Cif.) H.C. Evans, Stalpers, Samson & Benny. More recently, it was shown that M. roreri and the causal agent of witches’ broom of cacao, M. perniciosa, are sister species within the mushroom family Marasmiaceae.

=== Host range ===
The main hosts of M. roreri are plants in the Malvaceae that belong to the genus Theobroma, such as T. cacao, T. gileri, T. bicolor, and T. grandiflorum, as well as plants in the closely related genus Herrania. In contrast, the sister species M. perniciosa has a much broader host range, including hosts in the Solanaceae, Malpighiaceae, and Bignoniaceae.

=== Infection process and symptomatology ===
M. roreri is a hemibiotrophic fungus that forms swollen irregularly shaped intercellular mycelia. The infection process starts when conidia of M. roreri land on the surface of the pods. Then they germinate and penetrate the pod directly through the epidermis, causing internal damage in the early stages of the disease. The initiation of the necrotrophic phase begins when asexual spore masses are produced on the pod surface. External symptoms like dark spots on the surface of pods can be seen only after 40 to 80 days post infection; thus infected pods during the early stages appear asymptomatic, which is one factor that has led to the unwitting movement of infected pods by humans. One week after the appearance of dark lesions, the characteristic white powder of the disease appears on the surface of infected pods. The powdery appearance is due to the presence of millions of conidia that can reach up to 44 million per square centimeter with a mature infected pod capable of producing more than seven billion spores.

== History of the disease ==
=== First report ===
The first verified report of frosty pod rot is from Ecuador in 1895; some years later in the region of Quevedo, Ecuador in 1918, the most famous outbreak in the history of the disease was reported, causing abandonment of most of the cacao plantations over a period of three years. However, an earlier disease in Colombia may have also been caused by M. roreri. In 1817 in the region of Santander, Colombia, a disease with symptomology that matches that of frosty pod rot was reported; therefore, many researchers believe the first known report of frosty pod rot of cacao was in Colombia around one century before the famous outbreak in Ecuador.

=== Spread ===
Before the 1950s, M. roreri was confined to Ecuador, Colombia, and western Venezuela. However, during the last 50 years, the disease has spread southward into Peru (in 1988), and northward into all cacao-growing areas of Central America (Costa Rica, 1978; Nicaragua, 1979; Honduras, 1997; Guatemala, 2002; Belize, 2004 and Mexico, 2005), in many cases resulting in abandonment of the entire plantation by farmers. The presence of the disease was confirmed in El Salvador and Bolivia in 2009 and 2012, respectively, where the fungus probably arrived some years before. This invasive behavior of the disease represents a threat to cacao growers from Brazil and also to areas outside of Latin America where the majority of the world cocoa is currently produced.

== Economic impact of the disease ==
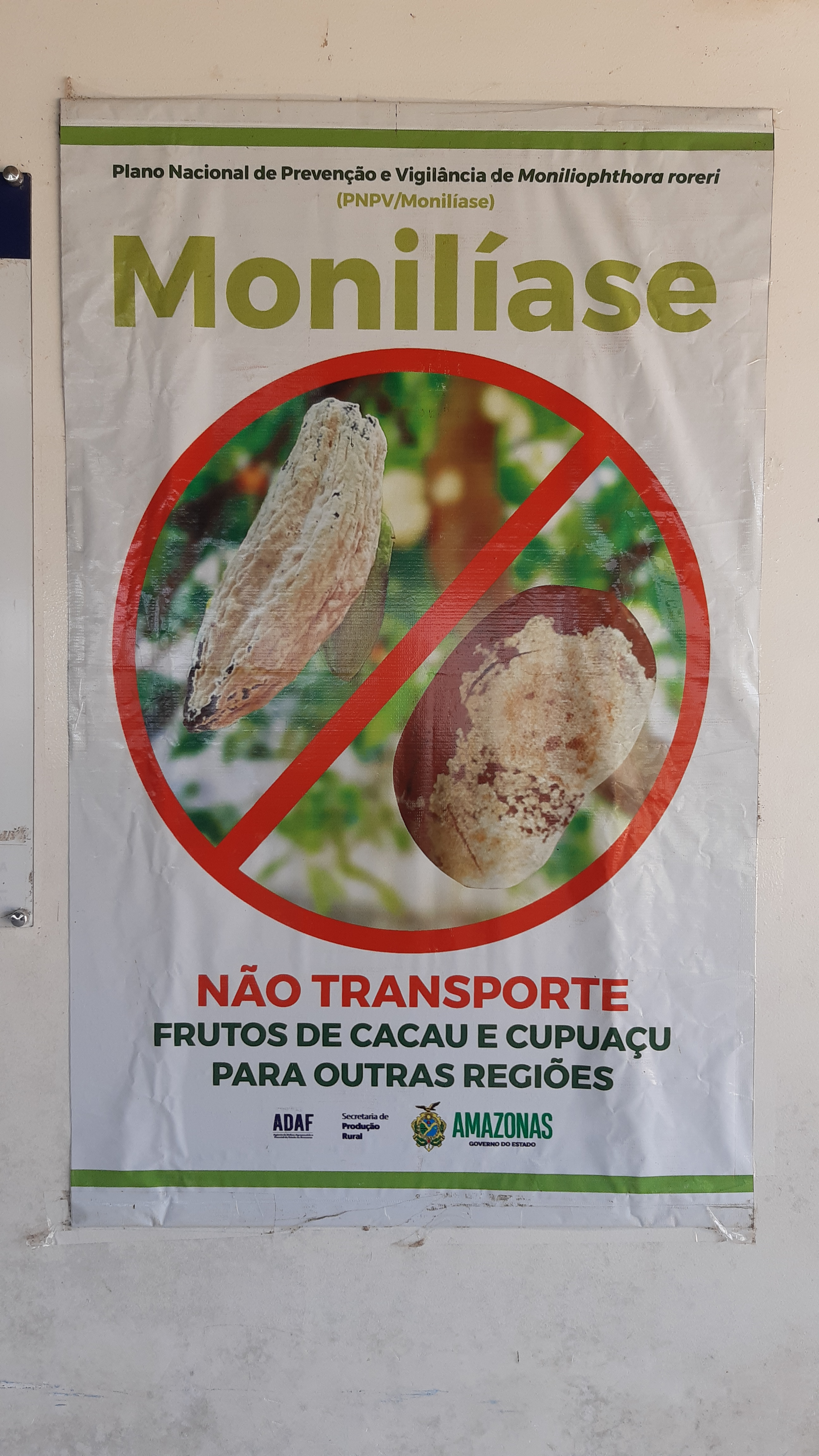
A warning sign at the port of Tabatinga, Brazil announcing "Do not transport cacao and capuaçu fruits to other regions"

In Colombia, specifically in the Santander region, average annual losses are of 40% of dry cacao equivalent to US$33 million due to the disease. In Ecuador, during the 1918 outbreak, cacao exportation was reduced from 46,000 to 37,700 tons due to frosty pod rot. In Peru, around 16,500 ha of cacao were abandoned mostly as a result of frosty pod rot, with a final result that Peru went from being an exporter of chocolate to a net importer. In Mexico, in the state of Tabasco, the first report of the disease was in April 2005, and by 2007, frosty pod rot had invaded all cacao areas of the state, becoming the major limiting factor to cacao production there, as well as in Nicaragua and Honduras.
