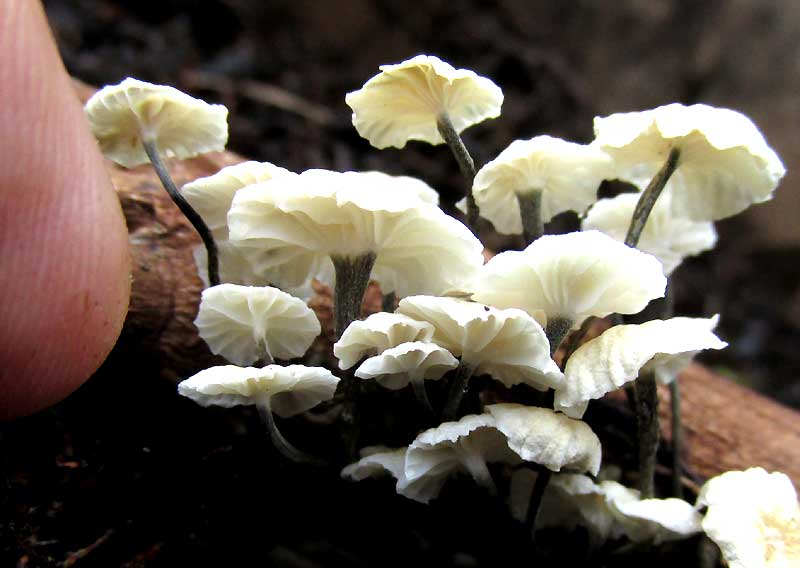
- Tetrapyrgos nigripes cluster on twig

Scientific classification
- Kingdom: Fungi
- Division: Basidiomycota
- Class: Agaricomycetes
- Order: Agaricales
- Family: Marasmiaceae
- Genus: Tetrapyrgos
- Species: T. nigripes

Binomial name
- Tetrapyrgos nigripes (Fr.) E. Horak

Synonyms
- Agaricus nigripes Schwein.; Chamaeceras nigripes (Fr.) Kuntze; Heliomyces nigripes (Fr.) Morgan; Marasmiellus nigripes (Fr.) Singer; Pterospora nigripes (Fr.) E. Horak; Marasmius caesius Murrill

= Tetrapyrgos nigripes =

Species of fungus

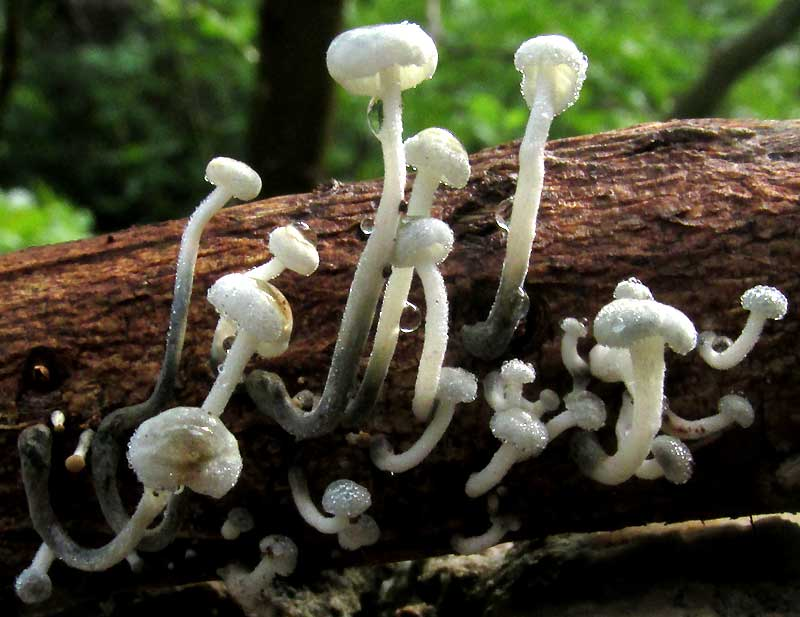
Emerging from dead twig

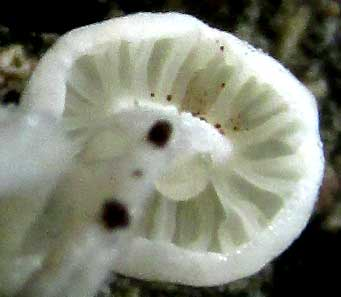
Forking gills below cap

Tetrapyrgos nigripes, with several English names such as blackfoot parachute, black-stalked marasmius and white tealtail, is a mushroom mostly occurring in the Americas. It belongs to the family Marasmiaceae.

== Description ==
Tetrapyrgos nigripes is an unusually small mushroom with a white cap, or pileus, and a very slender, somewhat stiff, mostly blackish stalk, or stipe. Some of the most distinctive features distinguishing the species from similar taxa, particularly Tetrapyrgos longicystidiata, are microscopic; the latter species' "cheilocystidia" (cystidia cells at the gills' edges) are longer. Here are some easy to see features helping to identify Tetrapyrgos nigripes:

- The white cap is 4–18 mm (3/16–11/16 in) in diameter. When young, its margin can curve inward or even roll somewhat. When older, the cap grows flatter or develops a depression in the center, with the margin straight or upturned. When young, the cap surface is smooth but soon shallow grooves or ridges develop, converging at the cap's center. Surface texture is dull, dry, opaque and covered with a fine, whitish, powdery or waxy bloom looking like frost. With age the cap discolors irregularly with gray spots or splotches.
- Gills attach to the stalk, sometimes briefly extending down it. One to three series of shorter gills not attached to the stalk may be forked or not.
- Stalks may be up to 30 mm (1 3/16 in) long and 2 mm (1/16 in) wide. They attach to the cap's center or near it. They are tough, pliable, hollow, and bear tiny white hairs. Stalk tops are pure white, but toward the base become dark gray to nearly black or bluish black.
- Spore prints are white. The mushroom's odor and taste is not distinctive.

== Distribution ==
Tetrapyrgos nigripes occurs in western Canada south throughout the USA and Mexico. In Central America it is found in Guatemala and Costa Rica; In the Caribbean it is in the British Virgin Islands and Puerto Rico. In South America it occurs in Colombia, Ecuador, Brazil and Bolivia. Also it in Australia. It is documented in Cuba.

== Habitat ==
The stalk base of Tetrapyrgos nigripes is directly inserted into the substrate, which usually is a twig or leaf, in North America mainly in an oak leaf or twig. In Cuba, Tetrapyrgos nigripes is found associated with Cashew trees in conditions of high relative humidity.

== Ecology ==
Tetrapyrgos nigripes is a saprophyte feeding on dead organic matter. Saprobic fungi break down and recycle nutrients from wood and other forest debris, creating healthy soil, and freeing up soil nutrients for microbes, insects, and growing plants.

== Edibility ==
Tetrapyrgos nigripes is regarded as not edible, if only because it is so small.

== Taxonomy ==
In 1838 when Elias Magnus Fries formally described and named Tetrapyrgos nigripes under the basionym of Marasmius nigripes, he noted that he had personally examined a specimen sent by Lewis David von Schweinitz, who originally had described the specimen in his Synopsis fungorum Carolinae superioris of 1822. This information is given in Fries's shorthand "Schwein.! Car. n. 678". The "n. 678" references the entry number 678 of the taxon in the work by Schweinitz, and the "Car" refers to Synopsis fungorum Carolinae . Schweinitz's 1822 name was earlier than Fries's, but Schweinitz's name later was recognized as illegitimate because even earlier it had been used by Jakob Gabriel Trog for the taxon now known as Macrocystidia cucumis.

=== Etymology ===
The genus name Tetrapyrgos is derived from the Greek τετρα, or tetra, meaning "four" and πύργος, or pyrgos, meaning "tower." This refers to spores of species of the genus featuring sharply projecting nodules or corners, suggesting a small structure with four distinct towers.

The species name nigripes derives from the Latin niger, meaning "black," and pēs, meaning "foot."
