= Cymatellopsis =

Scientific classification
- Kingdom: Fungi
- Division: Basidiomycota
- Class: Agaricomycetes
- Order: Agaricales
- Family: Marasmiaceae
- Genus: Cymatellopsis; Parmasto

Type species
- Cymatellopsis ilmiana Parmasto

Genus of fungi

Cymatellopsis is a genus of fungus in the mushroom family Marasmiaceae. This is a monotypic genus, containing the single species Cymatellopsis ilmiana, found in east Africa.

== See also ==
- List of Marasmiaceae genera
