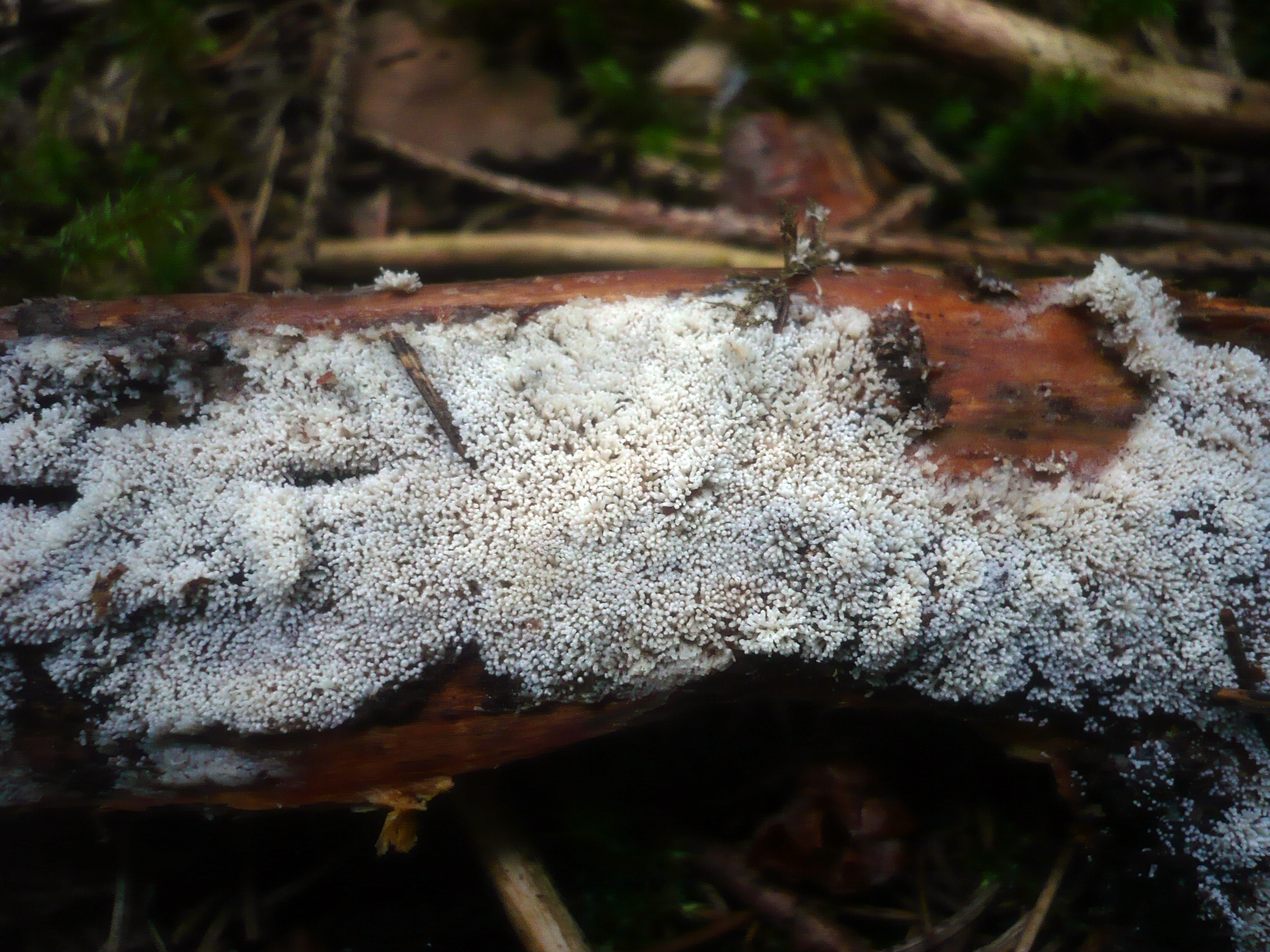
- Rectipilus fasciculatus

Scientific classification
- Kingdom: Fungi
- Division: Basidiomycota
- Class: Agaricomycetes
- Order: Agaricales
- Family: Marasmiaceae
- Genus: Rectipilus; Agerer (1973)

Type species
- Rectipilus fasciculatus (Pers.) Agerer (1973)

Species
- R. bavaricus; R. cistophilus; R. confertus; R. davidii; R. erubescens; R. fasciculatus; R. idahoensis; R. natalensis; R. sulphureus

= Rectipilus =

Genus of fungi

Rectipilus is a genus of cyphelloid fungi in the family Marasmiaceae. The widespread genus contains nine species. It was circumscribed by Reinhard Agerer in 1973.
