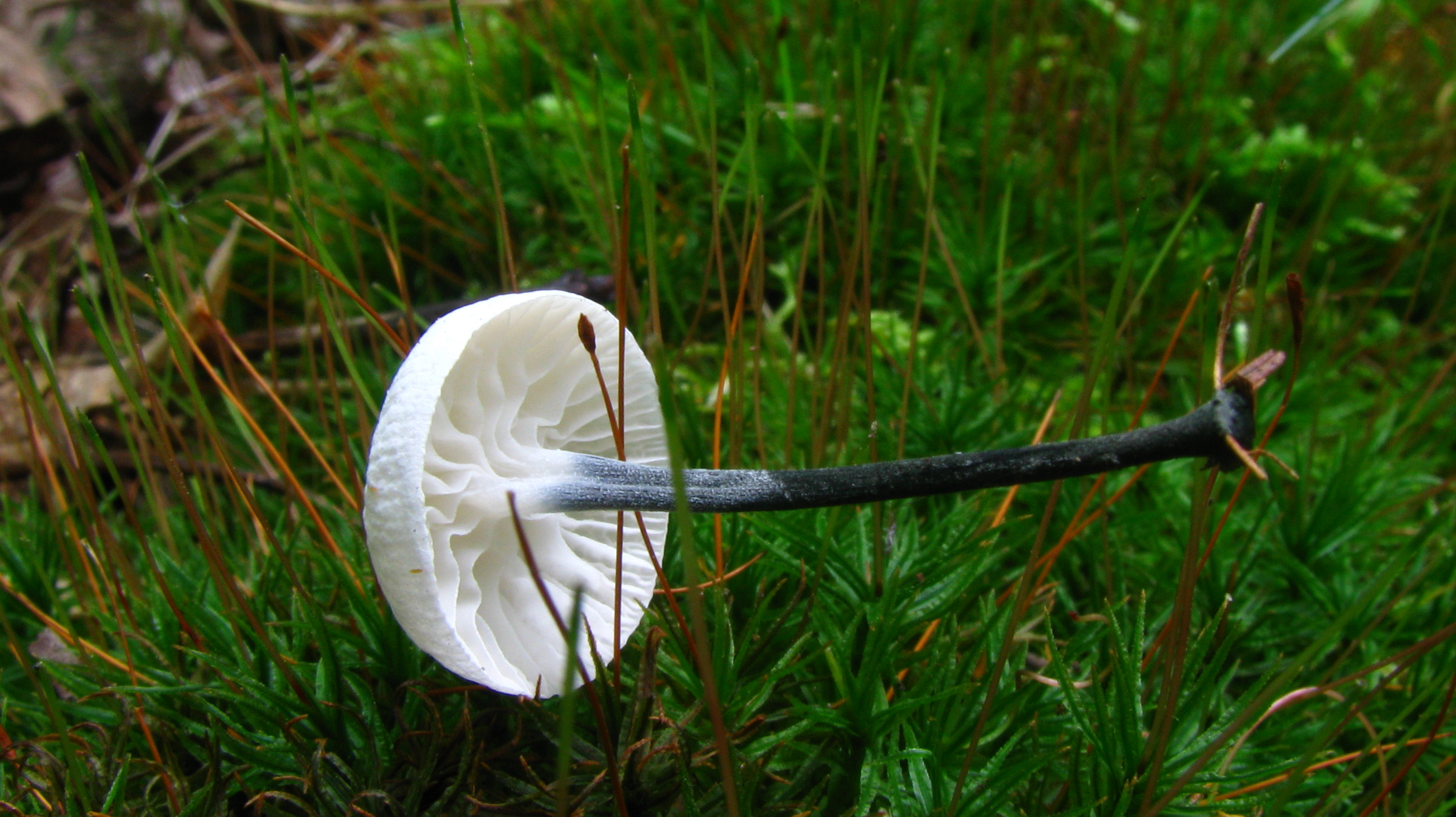
- Tetrapyrgos nigripes

Scientific classification
- Kingdom: Fungi
- Division: Basidiomycota
- Class: Agaricomycetes
- Order: Agaricales
- Family: Marasmiaceae
- Genus: Tetrapyrgos; E.Horak (1987)

Type species
- Tetrapyrgos atrocyanea (Métrod) E.Horak (1987)

= Tetrapyrgos =

Genus of fungi

Tetrapyrgos is a genus of fungi in the mushroom family Marasmiaceae. The genus has a widespread distribution and contains 16 species.

== Species ==
- T. aequatorialis
- T. alba
- T. atrocyanea
- T. austrochilensis
- T. dendrophora
- T. diplocystis
- T. goniospora
- T. nigripes
- T. olivaceonigra
- T. peullensis
- T. reducta
- T. simulans
- T. stipitata
- T. subcinerea
- T. subdendrophora
- T. tropicalis

== See also ==
- List of Marasmiaceae genera
