= Glabrocyphella =

Scientific classification
- Kingdom: Fungi
- Division: Basidiomycota
- Class: Agaricomycetes
- Order: Agaricales
- Family: Marasmiaceae
- Genus: Glabrocyphella; W.B.Cooke

Type species
- Glabrocyphella palmarum (Berk. & M.A.Curtis) W.B.Cooke

Genus of fungi

Glabrocyphella is a genus of fungi in the family Marasmiaceae. The widespread genus contains 13 species.

== Species ==
- Glabrocyphella ailanthi
- Glabrocyphella bananae
- Glabrocyphella brunneocrystallina
- Glabrocyphella dermatoides
- Glabrocyphella ellisiana
- Glabrocyphella epileucina
- Glabrocyphella filicicola
- Glabrocyphella ohiensis
- Glabrocyphella palmarum
- Glabrocyphella rubescens
- Glabrocyphella upplandensis

== See also ==
- List of Marasmiaceae genera
