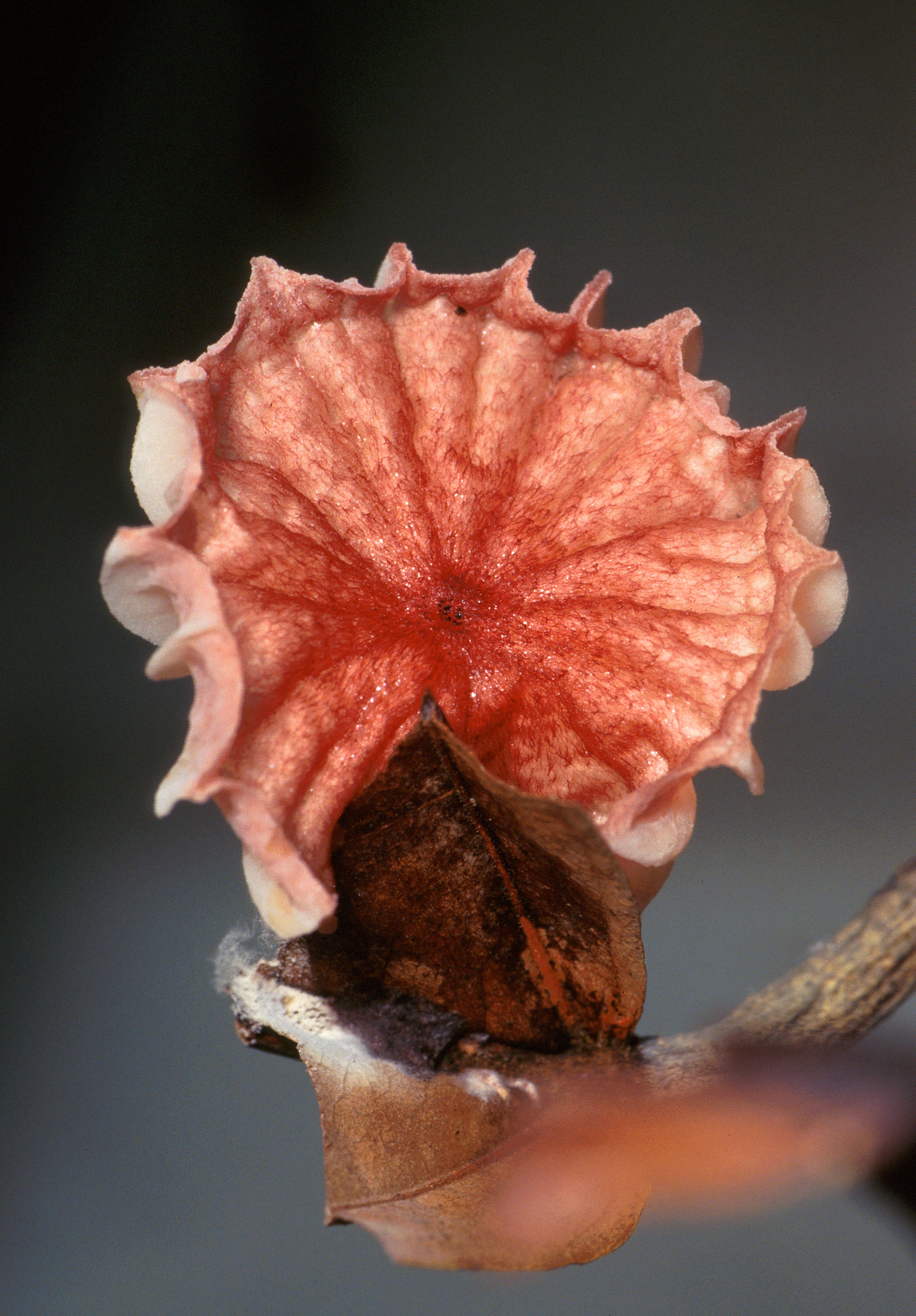
- Moniliophthora perniciosa

Scientific classification
- Kingdom: Fungi
- Division: Basidiomycota
- Class: Agaricomycetes
- Order: Agaricales
- Family: Marasmiaceae
- Genus: Moniliophthora; H.C.Evans, Stalpers, Samson & Benny (1978)

Type species
- Moniliophthora roreri (Cif.) H.C.Evans, Stalpers, Samson & Benny (1978)

Species
- see text

= Moniliophthora =

Genus of fungi

Moniliophthora is a genus of fungi in the family Marasmiaceae. The genus was described in 1978 with M. roreri as the type species. This fungus, formerly known as Monilia roreri, causes frosty pod rot, a serious disease of Theobroma cacao.

Moniliophthora is closely related to the genus Crinipellis, also having distinctive tiny hairs on the cap surface, but is distinguished by having a flexible stem and a reddish coloration of the fruiting body.

== Species ==
MycoBank lists the following:

- M. aurantiaca
- M. canescens
- M. conchata
- M. marginata
- M. nigrilineata
- M. perniciosa
- M. roreri

== See also ==
- List of Marasmiaceae genera
