= Nochascypha =

Scientific classification
- Kingdom: Fungi
- Division: Basidiomycota
- Class: Agaricomycetes
- Order: Agaricales
- Family: Marasmiaceae
- Genus: Nochascypha; Agerer

Type species
- Nochascypha filicina (P.Karst.) Agerer

Species
- N. dumontii N. filicina N. jacksonii N. paraensis N. paraguayensis N. stricta

Genus of fungi

Nochascypha is a genus of fungus in the family Marasmiaceae. The genus contains six species found in South America.

== See also ==
- List of Marasmiaceae genera
