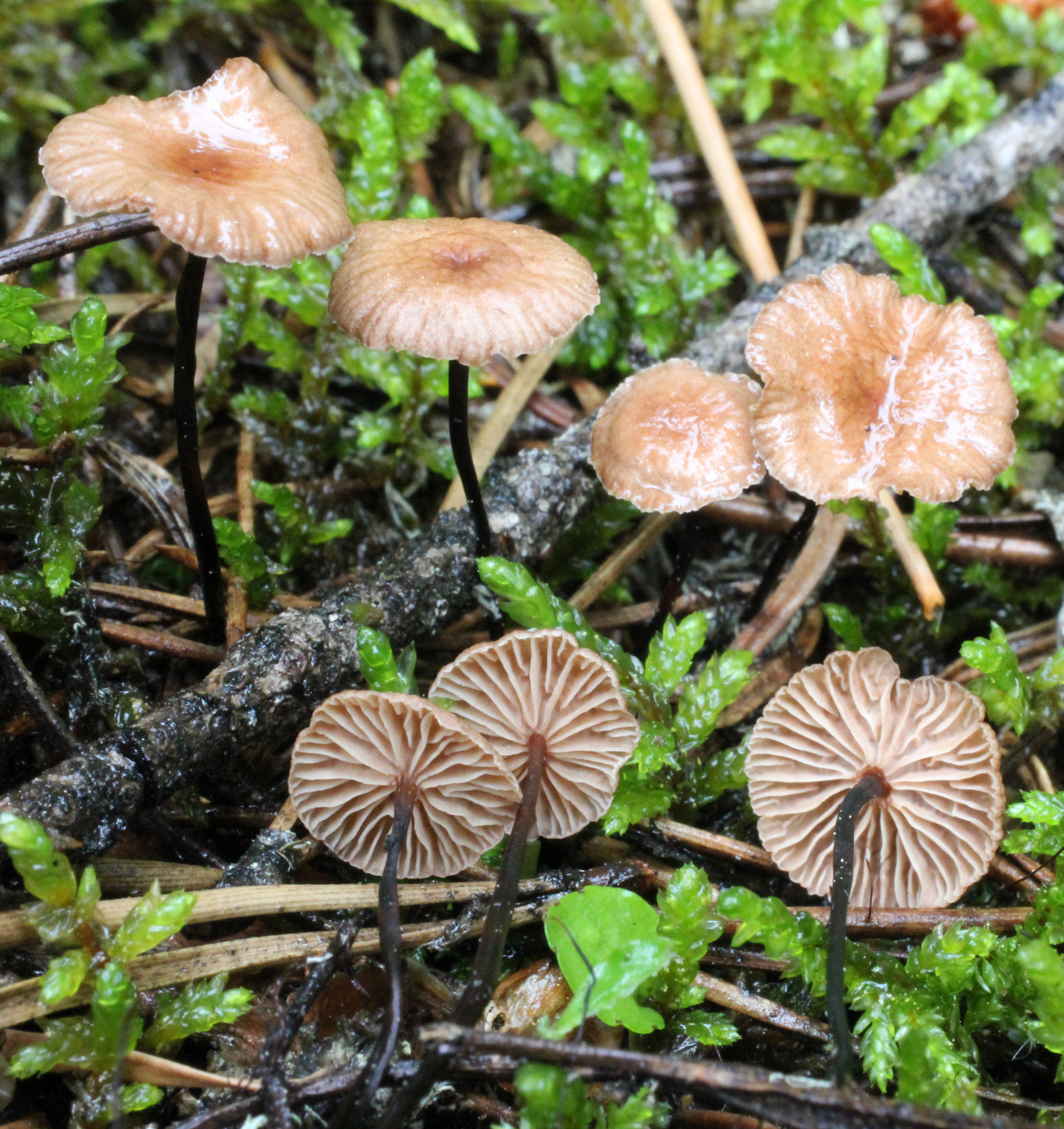
- S. androsaceus (now Marasmius androsaceus)

Scientific classification
- Kingdom: Fungi
- Division: Basidiomycota
- Class: Agaricomycetes
- Order: Agaricales
- Family: Marasmiaceae
- Genus: Setulipes; Antonín

Type species
- Setulipes androsaceus (L.) Antonín

Species
- ~25

= Setulipes =

Genus of fungi

Setulipes was a proposed genus of fungi in the family Marasmiaceae. This group of mushrooms, described by the Czech mycologist Vladimír Antonín in 1987, has a widespread distribution in north temperate areas, and would contain about 25 species.

In 2004, it was reported that molecular analysis indicates the type species "S. androsaceus" to lie within the genus Gymnopus. In a 2010 monograph, referring to Mata's paper, Antonín himself confirmed that all the Setulipes species should be included in Gymnopus and not constitute a separate genus. Also Species Fungorum agrees with this interpretation.

== Species ==
- Setulipes afibulatus
- Setulipes androsaceus
- Setulipes brevistipitasus
- Setulipes congolensis
- Setulipes curvistipitatus
- Setulipes funaliformis
- Setulipes haxgalensis
- Setulipes kisangensis
- Setulipes mauritiensis
- Setulipes moreaui
- Setulipes quercophilus
- Setulipes rhizomorphicola
