= Cymatella =

Scientific classification
- Kingdom: Fungi
- Division: Basidiomycota
- Class: Agaricomycetes
- Order: Agaricales
- Family: Marasmiaceae
- Genus: Cymatella; Pat.

Type species
- Cymatella minima Pat.

Species
- C. longipes C. marasmioides C. minima C. pulverulenta

Genus of fungi

Cymatella is a genus of fungus in the family Marasmiaceae. The genus contains four species found in the Antilles.

== See also ==
- List of Marasmiaceae genera
