= Amyloflagellula =

Scientific classification
- Kingdom: Fungi
- Division: Basidiomycota
- Class: Agaricomycetes
- Order: Agaricales
- Family: Marasmiaceae
- Genus: Amyloflagellula; Singer

Type species
- Amyloflagellula pulchra (Berk. & Broome) Singer

Genus of fungi

Amyloflagellula is a genus of fungi in the family Marasmiaceae.

== Species ==
- A. inflata Agerer & Boidin 1981
- A. pseudoarachnoidea (Dennis) Singer 1966
- A. pulchra (Berk. & Broome) Singer 1966
- A. verrucosa Agerer & Boidin 1981

== See also ==
- List of Marasmiaceae genera
