= Metulocyphella =

Scientific classification
- Kingdom: Fungi
- Division: Basidiomycota
- Class: Agaricomycetes
- Order: Agaricales
- Family: Marasmiaceae
- Genus: Metulocyphella; Agerer

Type species
- Metulocyphella lanceolata Agerer

Species
- M. lanceolata M. rostrata

Genus of fungi

Metulocyphella is a genus of fungus in the family Marasmiaceae. The genus contains two species found in South America.

== See also ==
- List of Marasmiaceae genera
