= Skepperiella =

Scientific classification
- Kingdom: Fungi
- Division: Basidiomycota
- Class: Agaricomycetes
- Order: Agaricales
- Family: Marasmiaceae
- Genus: Skepperiella; Pilát

Type species
- Skepperiella spathularia (Berk. & M.A.Curtis) Pilát

Genus of fungi

Skepperiella is a genus of fungus in the family Marasmiaceae. The widespread genus contains four species. The genus was circumscribed by Albert Pilát in Bull. Soc. Mycol. France vol.43 on page 56 in 1927.

The genus name of Skepperia is in honour of Edmund Skepper (1825–1867), who was a British botanist and chemist.

== Species ==
As accepted by Species Fungorum;

- Skepperiella cochlearis Pegler (1973)
- Skepperiella merulioides (R. Heim) Pegler (1973)
- Skepperiella populi Singer (1963)
- Skepperiella spathularia (Berk. & M.A. Curtis) Pilát (1927)

== See also ==
- List of Marasmiaceae genera
