= Yunnan sudden death syndrome =

Cardiac arrest deaths in China

Yunnan sudden death syndrome refers to a series of cardiac arrests that afflicted significant numbers of rural villagers in Yunnan province in southwest China. Cases almost always occurred during the midsummer rainy season (from June to August), at an altitude of 1,800–2,400 m (5,900–7,900 ft). An estimated 400 deaths occurred over three decades. In the hours before death, about two-thirds of the victims experienced nausea, dizziness, heart palpitations, seizures, and fatigue.

The cause of the deaths was unknown until a 2010 paper in Science by researchers from the Chinese Center for Disease Control and Prevention revealed that they had isolated a significant factor common in every case: a toxic mushroom which was unintentionally gathered and consumed during wild mushroom harvests in the region. Previously the syndrome was thought to be caused by Keshan disease, which is caused by the Coxsackie virus.

The mushroom, Trogia venenata, is also known as 'Little White'. It was determined that families collecting fungi to sell had been eating these mushrooms as they have no commercial value. Three amino acids present in the mushrooms have been shown to be toxic. The mushrooms have also been shown to contain very high quantities of barium salts.

However, a 2012 paper in Applied and Environmental Microbiology based on analysis of Trogia venenata samples collected over four years in the area found that their barium levels were of a lower concentration similar to common food options like poultry. It concluded that while they may have been a factor as several victims had high barium levels, they might not be the primary factor, as about 35 kilograms would have to be eaten to be fatal. The authors hypothesized that genetics was also a factor since the victims were primarily female, some families had seven or more fatalities, and some villages lost a third of their population.

== See also ==
- List of deadly fungi
- Mushroom poisoning
- Hallucinogenic bolete mushroom
