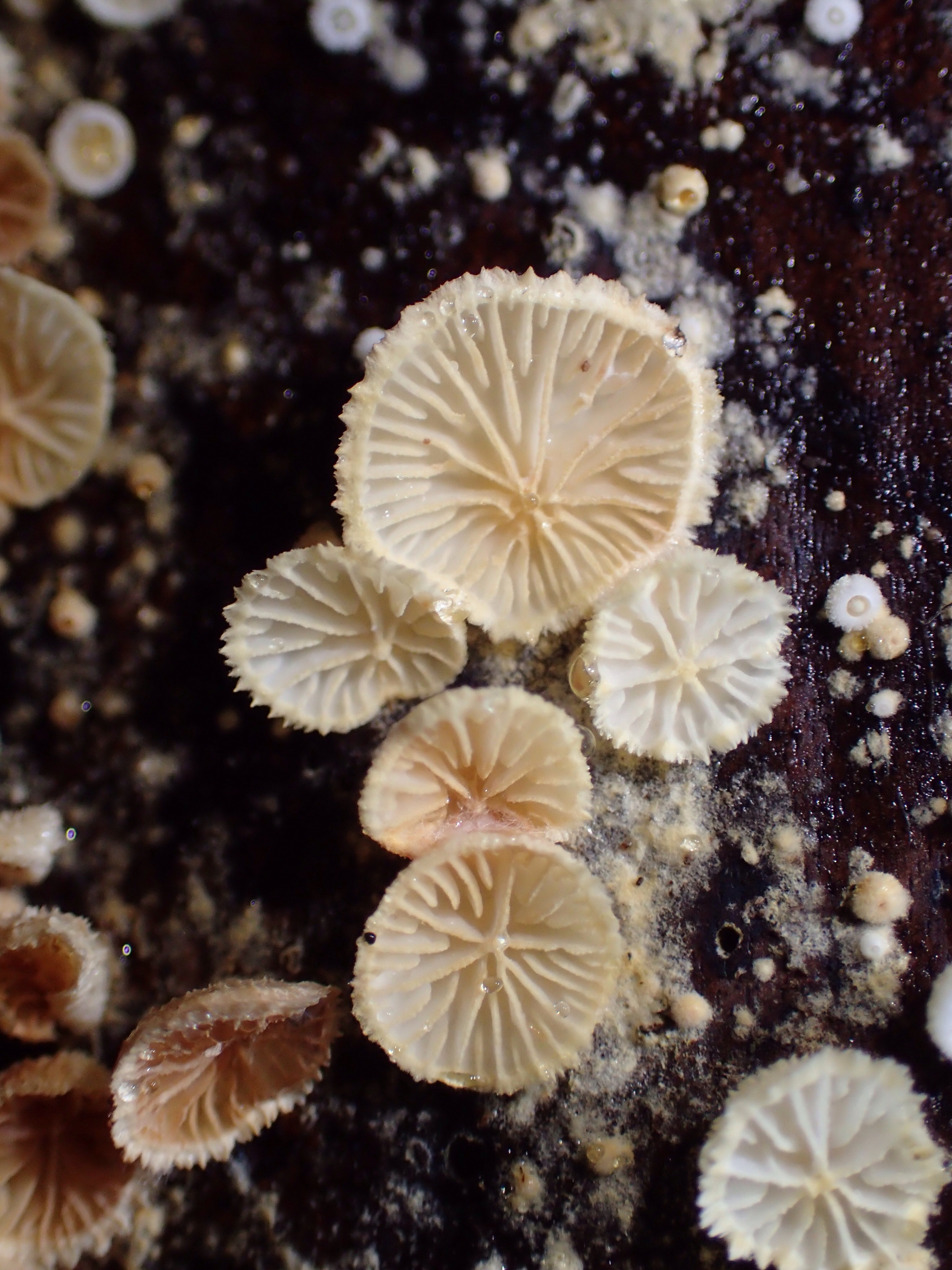

Scientific classification
- Domain: Eukaryota
- Kingdom: Fungi
- Division: Basidiomycota
- Class: Agaricomycetes
- Order: Agaricales
- Family: Marasmiaceae
- Genus: Chaetocalathus; Singer

Type species
- Chaetocalathus craterellus (Durieu & Lév.) Singer

= Chaetocalathus =

Genus of fungi

Chaetocalathus is a genus of fungus in the mushroom family Marasmiaceae.
