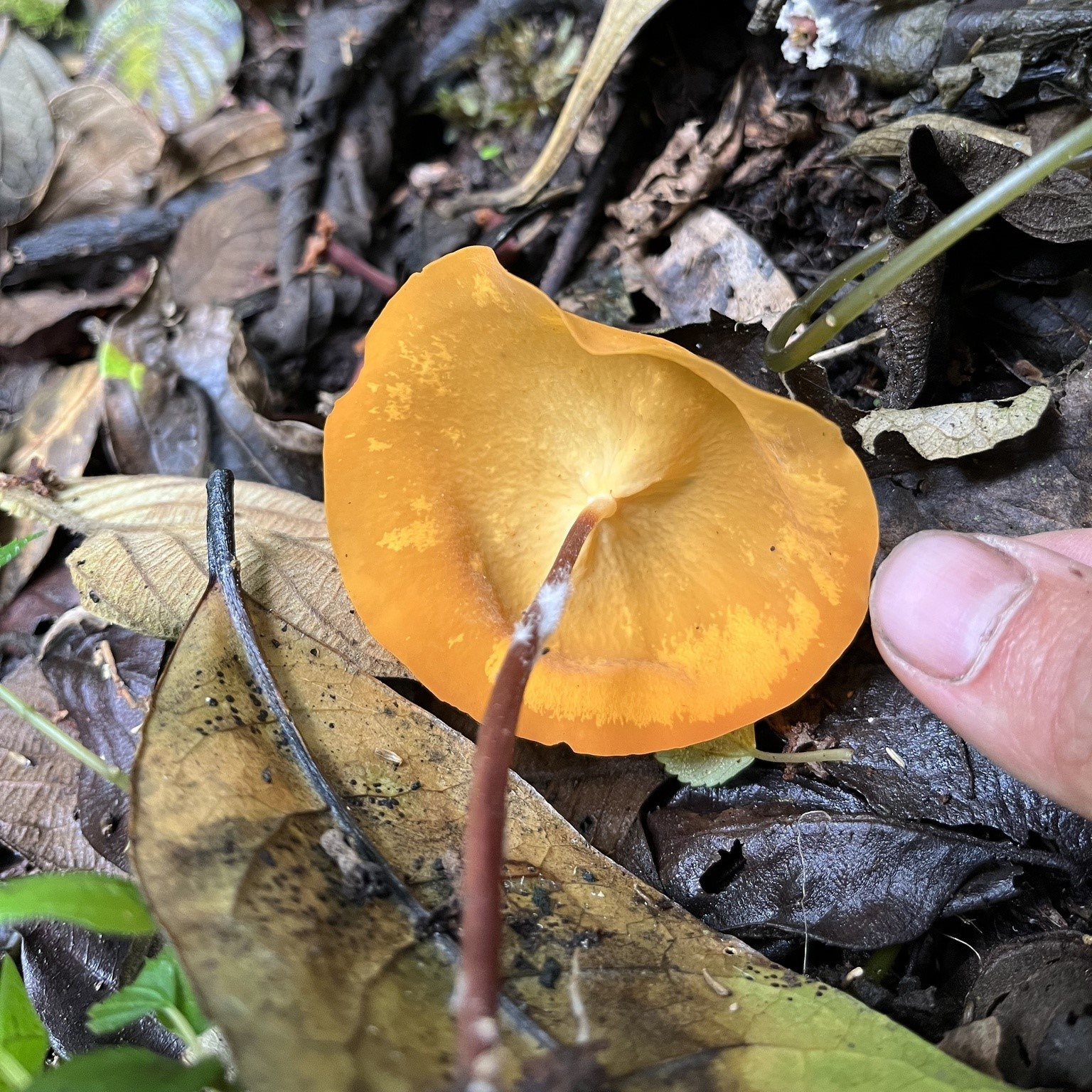

Scientific classification
- Domain: Eukaryota
- Kingdom: Fungi
- Division: Basidiomycota
- Class: Agaricomycetes
- Order: Agaricales
- Family: Marasmiaceae
- Genus: Hymenogloea; Pat. (1900)
- Species: H. riofrioi

Binomial name
- Hymenogloea riofrioi (Pat.) Pat. (1900)

Synonyms
- List (Genus): Libellus Lloyd (1913); (Species): Cantharellus partitus Berk.; Craterellus papyraceus Berk. & M.A. Curtis; Craterellus partitus (Berk.) Sacc.; Hymenogloea riofrioi (Pat.) Pat.; Stereum riofrioi Pat.; Trogia papyracea (Berk. & M.A. Curtis) Corner; Trombetta papyracea (Berk. & M.A. Curtis) Kuntze; Trombetta partita (Berk.) Kuntze; Xerotus partitus (Berk.) Berk

= Hymenogloea =

Genus of fungi

Hymenogloea is a fungal genus in the family Marasmiaceae. The genus is monotypic, containing the single species Hymenogloea riofrioi, found in tropical America.

== See also ==
- List of Marasmiaceae genera
