= Cheilophlebium =

Scientific classification
- Kingdom: Fungi
- Division: Basidiomycota
- Class: Agaricomycetes
- Order: Agaricales
- Family: incertae sedis
- Genus: Cheilophlebium; Opiz & Gintl (1856)

Type species
- Cheilophlebium villosum Opiz (1856)

Genus of fungi

Cheilophlebium is a fungal genus in the order Agaricales. It is incertae sedis with respect to familial placement within the order. The genus is monotypic, containing the single species Cheilophlebium villosum, described by Philipp Maximilian Opiz in 1856. According to the Dictionary of the Fungi (10th edition, 2008), the genus name is a nomen dubium (of unknown or doubtful application).
