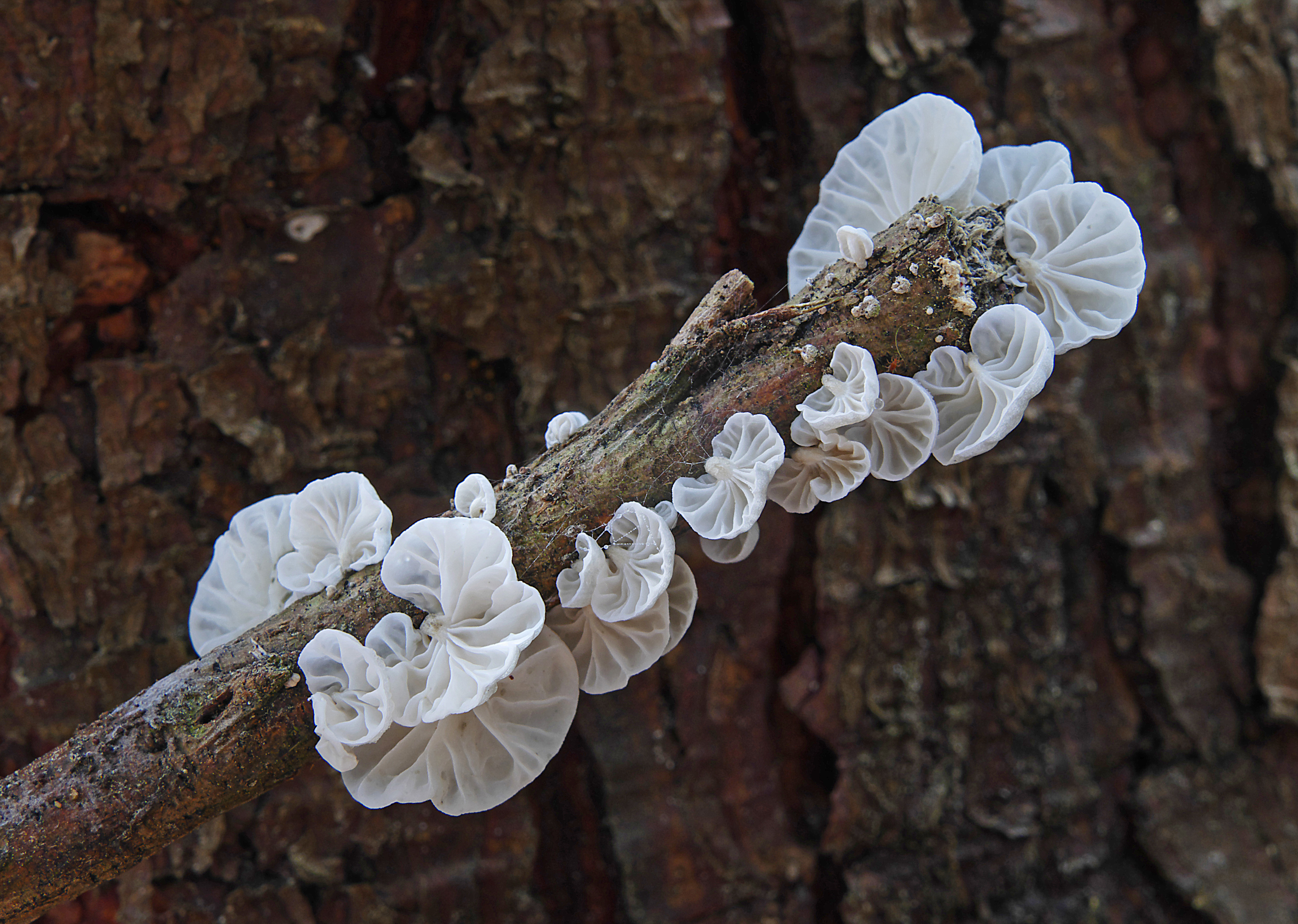
- Campanella species, Australia

Scientific classification
- Kingdom: Fungi
- Division: Basidiomycota
- Class: Agaricomycetes
- Order: Agaricales
- Family: Marasmiaceae
- Genus: Campanella; Henn.

Type species
- Campanella buettneri Henn.

= Campanella (fungus) =

Genus of fungi

Campanella is a genus of fungi in the family Marasmiaceae. The genus has a widespread distribution, especially in tropical regions, and contains about 40 species.

== Species ==
The following species are recognised in the genus Campanella:

- C. aberrans Singer (1976)
- C. aeruginea Singer (1976)
- C. africana Pegler (1977)
- C. agaricina (Mont.) Lloyd (1919)
- C. alnetorum Singer (1976)
- C. bispora (Manim. & Leelav.) Manim. (2014)
- C. bonii (Segedin) J.A. Cooper (2023)
- C. boninensis (S. Ito & S. Imai) Parmasto (1981)
- C. brunnescens Pegler (1977)
- C. buettneri Henn. (1895)
- C. burkei Desjardin & B.A. Perry (2017)
- C. caerulescens (Berk. & M.A. Curtis) Singer (1945)
- C. caesia Romagn. (1981)
- C. candida (A.L. Sm.) Singer (1945)
- C. capensis (Berk.) D.A. Reid (1975)
- C. castaneipes Singer (1976)
- C. elongatispora Singer (1976)
- C. fimbriata Segedin (1993)
- C. flava Rick (1938)
- C. floridana Singer (1951)
- C. gigantospora Singer (1975)
- C. gregaria Bougher (2007)
- C. heterobasidiata R. Valenz., Guzmán & J. Castillo (1981)
- C. inquilina Romagn. (1984)
- C. junghuhnii (Mont.) Singer (1945)
- C. keralensis Farook & Manim. (2014)
- C. marasmioides Rick (1960)
- C. merulina (Pers.) Singer (1961)
- C. mexicana Guzmán & Guzm.-Dáv. (1985)
- C. pendulosa Otieno (1968)
- C. podocarpi Singer (1976)
- C. purpurea (Berk. & M.A. Curtis) Lloyd (1919)
- C. purpureobrunnea Petch (1926)
- C. pustulata (Berk. & Broome) Pegler (1986)
- C. sarasinii (Wakef.) Lloyd (1924)
- C. straminea P.G. Liu (1994)
- C. tenuitunicata Singer (1955)
- C. tristis (G. Stev.) Segedin (1993)
- C. virginea Rick (1960)
- C. witteana Singer (1976)
