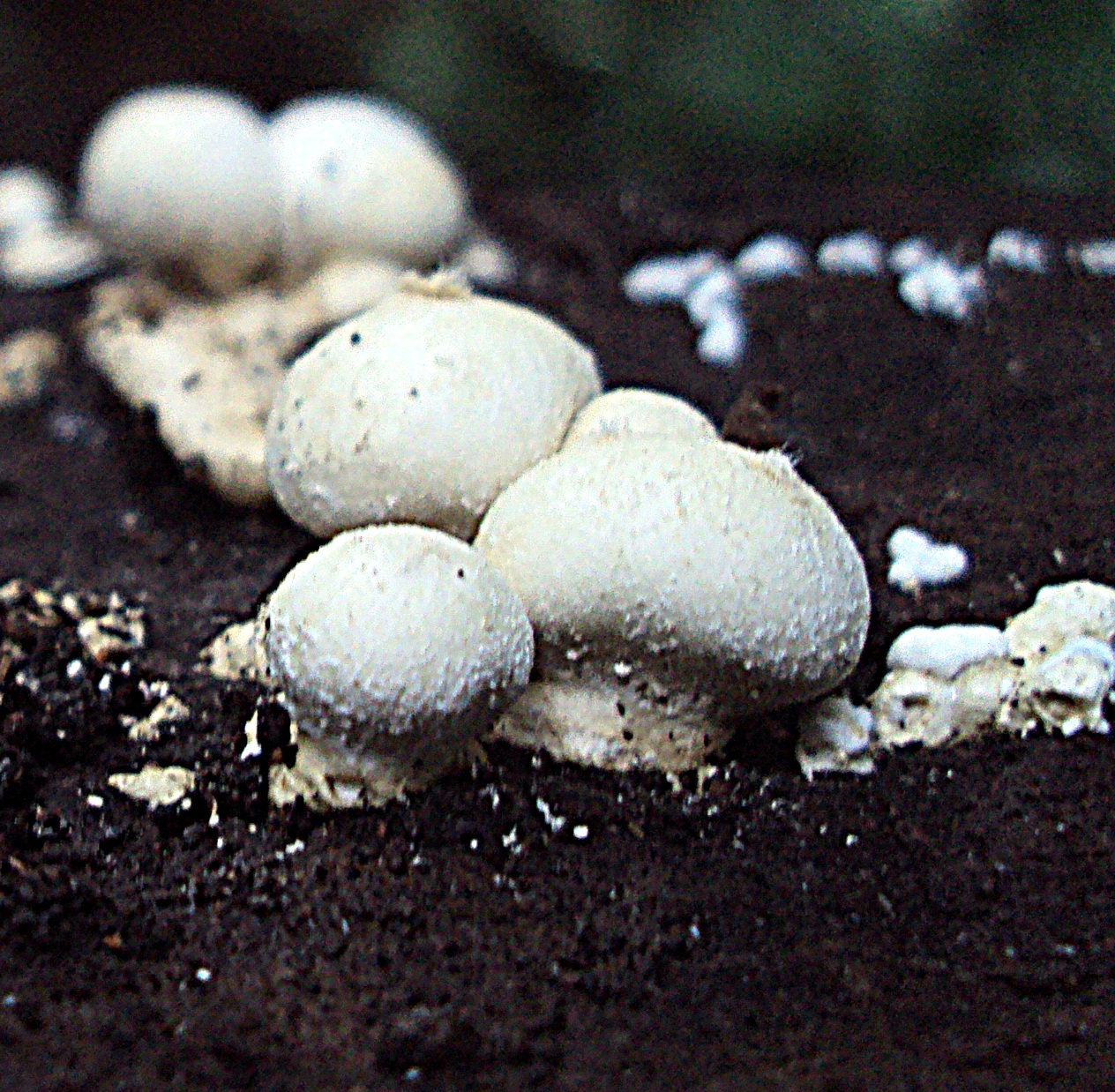
- Lycogalopsis solmsii

Scientific classification
- Kingdom: Fungi
- Division: Basidiomycota
- Class: Agaricomycetes
- Order: Agaricales
- Family: Agaricaceae
- Genus: Lycogalopsis; E.Fisch. (1886)

Type species
- Lycogalopsis solmsii E.Fisch. (1886)

Species
- L. africana L. dussii L. hypostratosa L. hypoxilinoides L. leopoldensis L. reticulata L. solmsii L. subiculosa L. zeylanica

Synonyms
- Enteromyxa Ces. (1879)

= Lycogalopsis =

Genus of fungi

Lycogalopsis is a genus of puffball fungi in the family Agaricaceae. It was circumscribed by mycologist Eduard Fischer in 1886, with L. solmsii as the type species.
