= Palaeocephala =

Scientific classification
- Kingdom: Fungi
- Division: Basidiomycota
- Class: Agaricomycetes
- Order: Agaricales
- Family: incertae sedis
- Genus: Palaeocephala; Singer
- Species: P. cymatelloides

Binomial name
- Palaeocephala cymatelloides (Dennis & D.A.Reid) Singer

Genus of fungi

Palaeocephala is a genus of fungi. This is a monotypic genus, containing the single species Palaeocephala cymatelloides, described by Rolf Singer in 1962. According to the Dictionary of the Fungi, the genus is classified in either the Marasmiaceae or Physalacriaceae families; the taxonomic database MycoBank includes it in the Marasmiaceae.
