= Aleurocystis =

Scientific classification
- Kingdom: Fungi
- Division: Basidiomycota
- Class: Agaricomycetes
- Order: Agaricales
- Family: incertae sedis
- Genus: Aleurocystis; Lloyd ex G.Cunn. (1956)

Type species
- Aleurocystis hakgallae (Berk. & Broome) G.Cunn. (1956)

Species
- Aleurocystis africana Ryvarden; Aleurocystis gloeocystidiata Rajchenb. & Robledo; Aleurocystis hakgallae (Berk. & Broome) G. Cunn.; Aleurocystis magnispora (Burt) P.A. Lemke

Genus of fungi

Aleurocystis is a genus of fungi of uncertain placement within the order Agaricales. The widely distributed genus contains four species. Aleurocystis was circumscribed by the New Zealand-based mycologist Gordon Herriot Cunningham in 1956.
