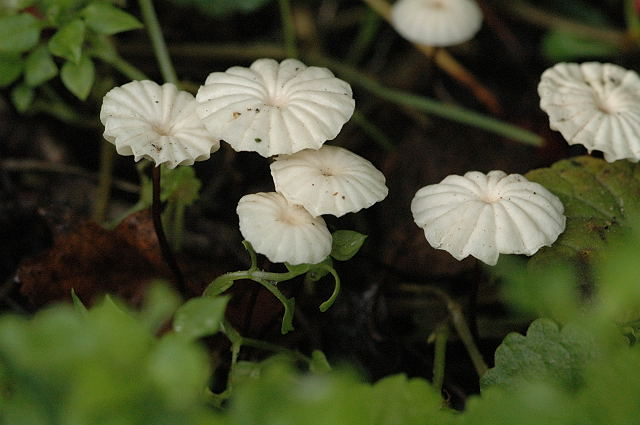
- Marasmius rotula

Scientific classification
- Kingdom: Fungi
- Division: Basidiomycota
- Class: Agaricomycetes
- Order: Agaricales
- Family: Marasmiaceae; Roze ex Kühner (1980)

Type genus
- Marasmius Fr. (1835)

= Marasmiaceae =

Family of fungi

The Marasmiaceae are a family of fungi in the order Agaricales. Basidiocarps (fruit bodies) are most frequently agarics (gilled mushrooms), but occasionally cyphelloid (in the genus Cellypha). According to a 2008 estimate, the family contained 54 genera and 1590 species, but molecular research, based on cladistic analysis of DNA sequences, has led to a more restricted family concept, so that the Marasmiaceae included just 13 genera, and some 1205 species. It was reduced further down in 2020, to 10 genera and about 700 species.

== Genera ==
As accepted by Wijayawardene et al. 2020;

- Amyloflagellula Singer (4)
- Brunneocorticium Sheng H. Wu (1)
- Campanella Henn. (ca. 39)
- Chaetocalathus Singer (ca. 20)
- Crinipellis Pat. (ca. 65)
- Hymenogloea Pat. (1)
- Marasmius Fr. (ca. 600)
- Moniliophthora H.C. Evans, Stalpers, Samson & Benny (7)
- Neocampanella Nakasone, Hibbett & Goranova (1)
- Tetrapyrgos E. Horak (18)

== See also ==
- List of Agaricales families
- List of Marasmiaceae genera
