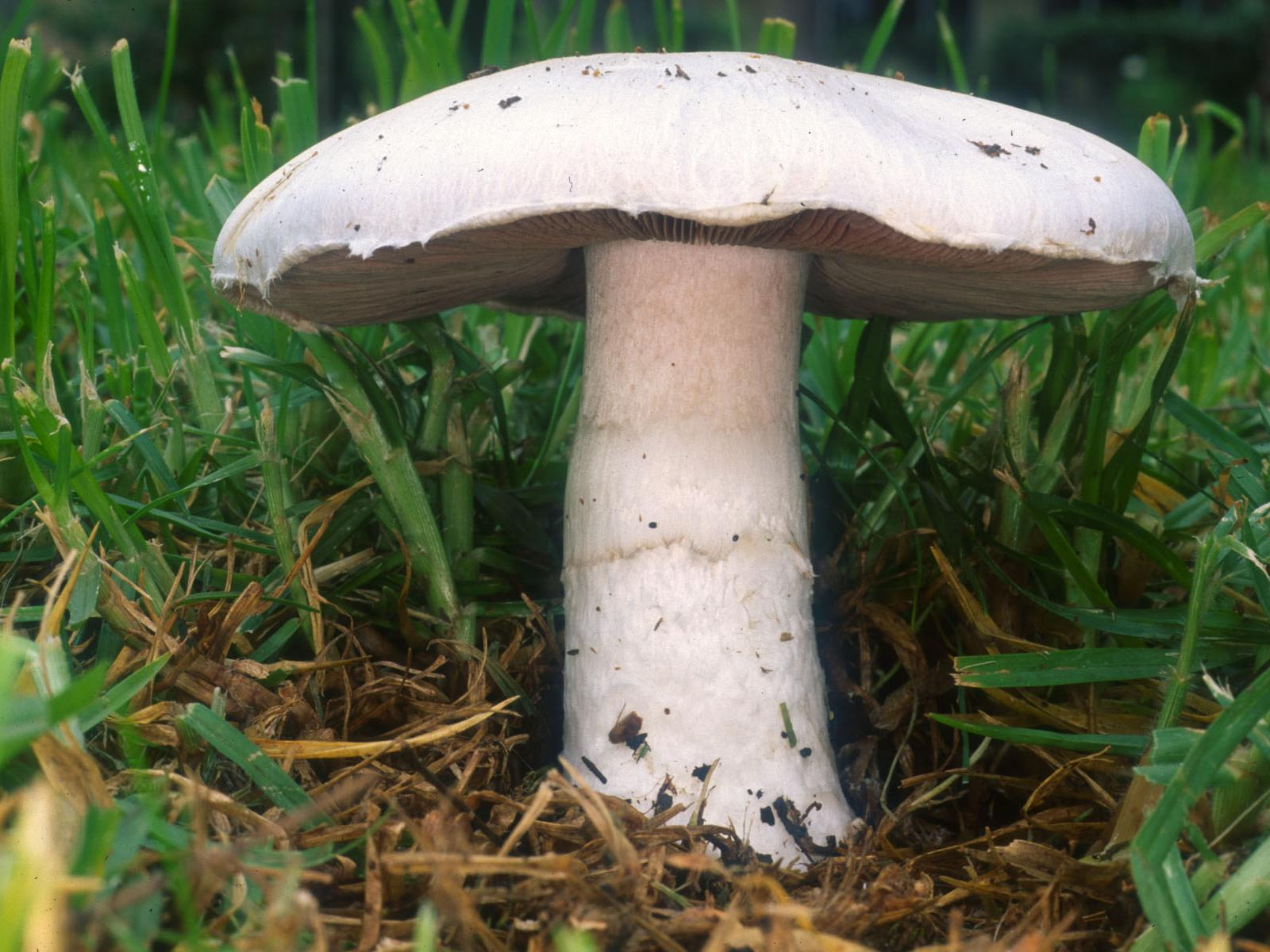
- Agaricus campestris (field mushroom) (Agaricaceae)

Scientific classification
- Kingdom: Fungi
- Division: Basidiomycota
- Class: Agaricomycetes
- Subclass: Agaricomycetidae
- Order: Agaricales; Underw. (1899)

Subdivisions
- 46 families, 400+ genera

Synonyms
- Amanitales Jülich (1981); Cortinariales Jülich (1981); Entolomatales Jülich (1981); Fistulinales Jülich (1981); Schizophyllales Nuss (1980)

= Agaricales =

Agaricales Temporal range: Upper Aptian–Holocene, 113–0 Ma

Order of mushrooms

The Agaricales are an order of fungi in the division Basidiomycota. As originally conceived, the order contained all the agarics (gilled mushrooms), but subsequent research has shown that not all agarics are closely related and some belong in other orders, such as the Russulales and Boletales. Conversely, DNA research has also shown that many non-agarics, including some of the clavarioid fungi (clubs and corals) and gasteroid fungi (puffballs and false truffles) belong within the Agaricales. The order has 46 extant families, more than 400 genera, and over 25,000 described species, along with six extinct genera known only from the fossil record. Species in the Agaricales range from the familiar Agaricus bisporus (cultivated mushroom) and the deadly Amanita virosa (destroying angel) to the coral-like Clavaria zollingeri (violet coral) and bracket-like Fistulina hepatica (beefsteak fungus).

== History, classification and phylogeny ==
In his three volumes of Systema Mycologicum published between 1821 and 1832, Elias Fries put almost all of the fleshy, gill-forming mushrooms in the genus Agaricus. He organized the large genus into "tribes", the names of many of which still exist as common genera of today. Fries later elevated several of these tribes to generic level, but later authors—including Gillet, Karsten, Kummer, Quélet, and Staude—made most of the changes. Fries based his classification on macroscopic characters of the fruit bodies and color of the spore print. His system had been widely used as it had the advantage that many genera could be readily identified based on characters observable in the field. Fries's classification was later challenged when microscopic studies of basidiocarp structure, initiated by Fayod and Patouillard, demonstrated several of Fries's groupings were unnatural. In the twentieth century, Rolf Singer's influential work The Agaricales in Modern Taxonomy, published in four editions spanning from 1951 to 1986, used both Fries's macroscopic characters and Fayod's microscopic characters to reorganize families and genera; his final classification included 230 genera within 18 families. Singer treated three major groups within the Agaricales sensu lato: the Agaricales sensu stricto, Boletineae, and Russulales. These groups are still accepted by modern treatments based on DNA analysis, as the euagarics clade, bolete clade, and russuloid clade.

Molecular phylogenetics research has demonstrated that the euagarics clade is roughly equivalent to Singer's Agaricales sensu stricto. A large-scale study by Brandon Matheny and colleagues used nucleic acid sequences representing six gene regions from 238 species in 146 genera to explore the phylogenetic grouping within the Agaricales. The analysis showed that most of the species tested could be grouped into six clades that were named the Agaricoid, Tricholomatoid, Marasmioid, Pluteoid, Hygrophoroid and Plicaturopsidoid clades.

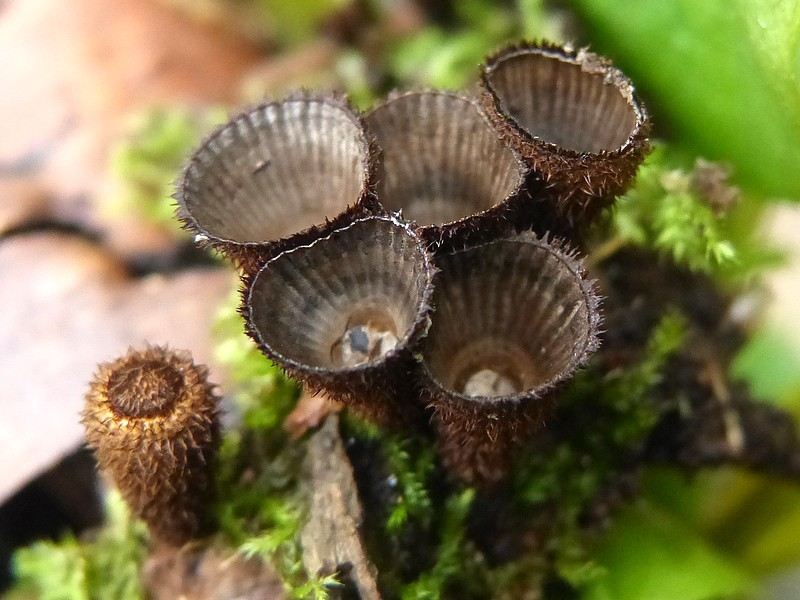
The bird's nest fungus Cyathus striatus

Molecular studies have shown that agarics are more divergent than once thought. Agarics in the genera Russula and Lactarius, for example, belong to the order Russulales, whilst agarics in the genera Paxillus and Hygrophoropsis belong in the Boletales. Conversely some genera with non-agaric fruit bodies, such as the puffballs, bird's nest fungi, and many clavarioid fungi, belong in the Agaricales.

== Distribution and habitat ==
Members of the Agaricales are ubiquitous, with species found in all continents. The great majority are terrestrial, in almost every habitat from woodland and grassland to deserts and dunes. Agaricoid species were long thought to be solely terrestrial, until the 2005 discovery of Psathyrella aquatica, the only gilled mushroom known to fruit underwater. Species are variously saprotrophic or ectomycorrhizal, occasionally parasitic on plants or other fungi, and sometimes lichenized.

the Agaricales include six monotypic fossil genera mostly found fossilized in amber. The oldest records are from three Cretaceous age genera; the late Aptian Gondwanagaricites magnificus from the Crato Formation (Brazil), the Albian age (approximately 100 Ma) Palaeoagaracites antiquus from Burmese amber and the slightly younger Turonian New Jersey Amber species Archaeomarasmius leggeti. The three other species, Aureofungus yaniguaensis, Coprinites dominicana and Protomycena electra are known from single specimens found in the Dominican amber mines of Hispaniola.

== Genera incertae sedis ==
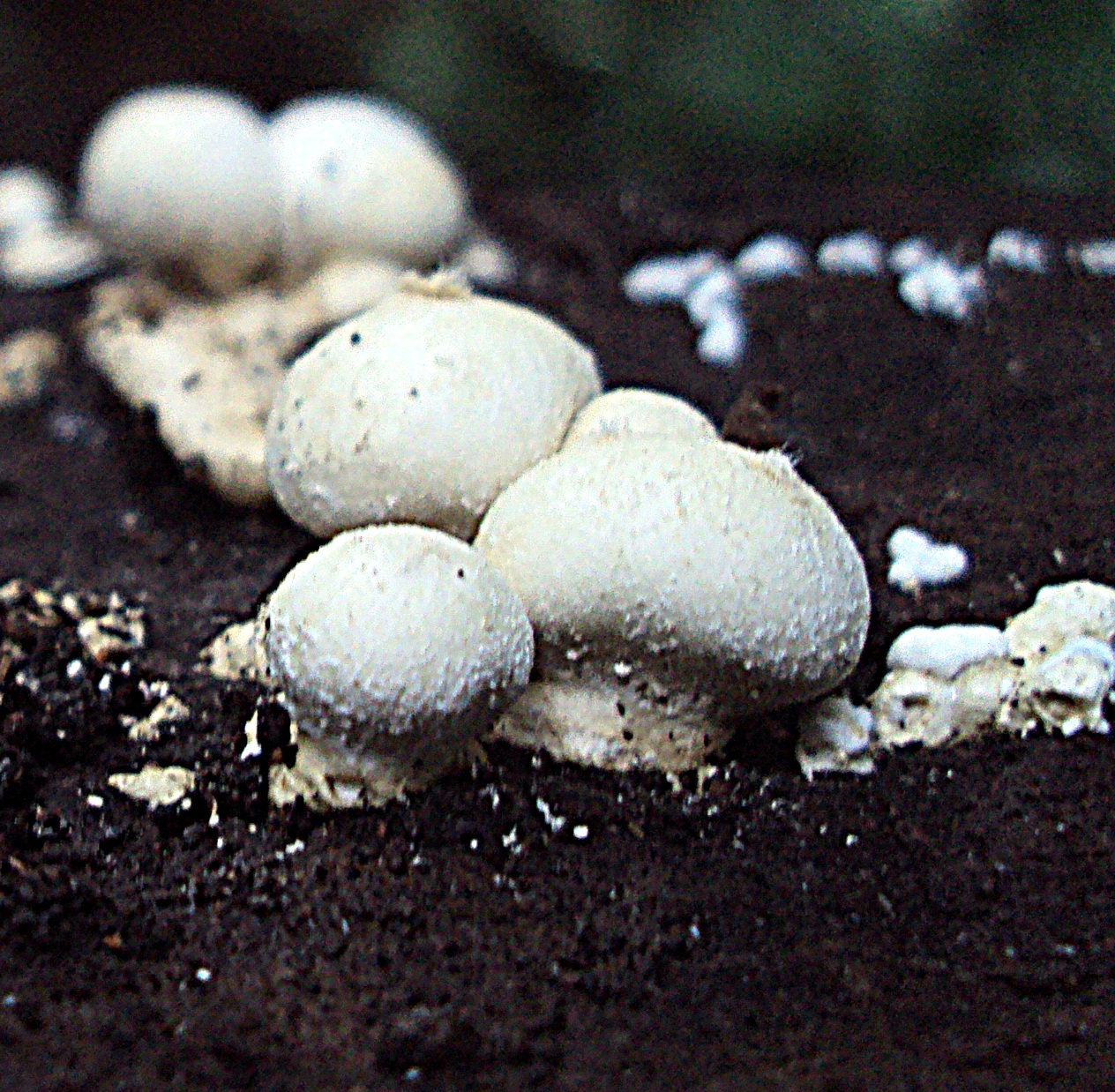
Lycogalopsis is a genus of puffballs (L. solmsii pictured) in the Agaricales that is incertae sedis with respect to familial placement.

There are several genera classified in the Agaricales that are i) poorly known, ii) have not been subjected to DNA analysis, or iii) if analysed phylogenetically do not group with as yet named or identified families, and have not been assigned to a specific family (i.e., incertae sedis with respect to familial placement). These include:

- Acinophora Raf. (1814) – 1 sp.
- Albocoprinus Voto (2020) – 1 sp.
- Aleurocystis Lloyd ex G.Cunn. (1956) – 4 spp.
- Arthrosporella Singer (1970) – 1 sp.
- Austroclitocybe Raithelh. (1972) – 2 spp.
- Austroomphaliaster Garrido (1988) – 2 spp.
- Callistodermatium Singer (1981) – 1 sp.
- Cephaloscypha Agerer (1975) – 1 sp.
- Cheilophlebium Opiz & Gintl (1856) – 1 sp.
- Cymatella Pat. (1899) – 1 sp.
- Cymatellopsis Parmasto (1985) – 1 sp.
- Cyphellocalathus Agerer (1981) – 1 sp.
- Glabrocyphella W.B.Cooke (1961) – 12 spp.
- Gramincola Velen. (1947) – 1 sp.
- Laterradea Raspail (1824) – 1 sp.
- Lycogalopsis E.Fisch. (1886) – 9 spp.
- Metraria (Cooke) Cooke & Massee (1891) – 2 spp.
- Meottomyces Vizzini (2008) – 2 spp.
- Metulocyphella Agerer (1893) – 2 spp.
- Mycoalvimia Singer (1981) – 1 sp.
- Mycospongia Velen. (1940) – 1 sp.
- Nochascypha Agerer (1983) – 6 spp.
- Palaeocephala Singer (1962) – 1 sp.
- Peglerochaete Sarwal & Locq. (1983) – 1 sp.
- Phlebonema R.Heim (1929) – 1 sp.
- Polygaster Fr. (1823) – 1 sp.
- Pseudohygrophorus Velen. (1940) – 1 sp.
- Secotium Kunze (1840) – ca. 15 spp.
- Skepperiella Pilát (1927) – 4 spp.
- Stanglomyces Raithelh. (1986) – 1 sp.
- Stemastrum Raf. (1808) – 1 sp.

== See also ==
- List of Agaricales families
