= List of Marasmius species =

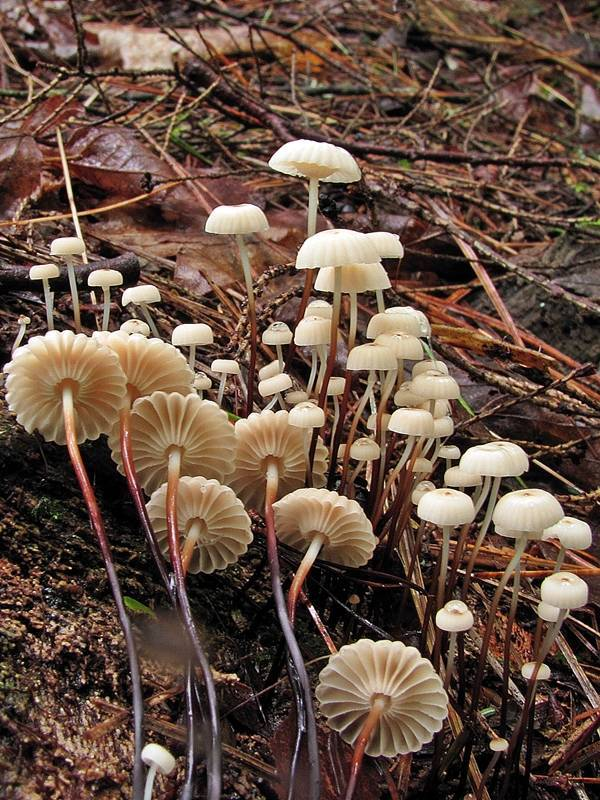
Marasmius rotula is the type species of genus Marasmius.

This is a list of species in the large agaric genus Marasmius. As of October 2018, Index Fungorum lists 949 species in the genus.

Note that several groups of species which were formerly considered to belong to Marasmius have been moved to the new genera Cryptomarasmius, Mycetinis and Rhizomarasmius.

A B C D E F G H I J K L M N O P Q R S T U V U W X Y Z

== A ==
- Marasmius abrubtipes Corner (1996)
- Marasmius abundans Corner (1996)
- Marasmius acanthocheilus Desjardin & E.Horak (1997)
- Marasmius acerinus Peck (1899)
- Marasmius acerosus Y.S.Tan & Desjardin (2007)
- Marasmius aciebrunneus Corner (1996)
- Marasmius aciecretaceus Corner (1996)
- Marasmius acierufus Corner (1996)
- Marasmius actiniceps (Kalchbr. & Cooke) D.A.Reid (1975)
- Marasmius aculeatus Pat. (1900)
- Marasmius acuminatus Henn. (1899)
- Marasmius acutus Corner (1996)
- Marasmius adhaesus Corner (1996)
- Marasmius adisianus Singer (1989)
- Marasmius aequatorialis Singer (1976)
- Marasmius africanus (Pat.) Sacc. (1895)
- Marasmius afrosulphureus Courtec. 1984
- Marasmius aimara Singer (1965)
- Marasmius alachuanus Murrill (1942)
- Marasmius albertianus Singer (1964)
- Marasmius albidocremeus Antonín (2003)
- Marasmius albidomurinus Singer (1989)
- Marasmius albidus (Cleland) Grgur. (1997)
- Marasmius albimyceliosus Corner (1996)
- Marasmius albinanus Corner (1996)
- Marasmius albofarinaceus Henn. (1901)
- Marasmius albogriseus (Peck) Singer (1943)
- Marasmius albopurpureus T.H. Li & C.Q. Wang (2015)
- Marasmius albostipitatus Chun Y.Deng & T.H.Li (2012)
- Marasmius alienus Peck (1910)
- Marasmius alliacioides Henn. (1895)
- Marasmius alliarius Petch (1948)
- Marasmius alliifoetidus Corner (1996)
- Marasmius alliipotens Corner (1996)
- Marasmius alliodoratissimus Garrido (1988)
- Marasmius allium Eichelb. (1906)
- Marasmius allocystis Singer (1965)
- Marasmius alniphilus J.Favre (1952)
- Marasmius alopecuis (Berk. & M.A.Curtis) Neda (2004)
- Marasmius alpinus Killerm. (1933)
- Marasmius alveolaris Cleland (1927)
- Marasmius amabilis Har. & Pat. (1903)
- Marasmius amaryllidis Torrend (1913)
- Marasmius amazonicus Henn. (1904)
- Marasmius amethystinus J.Favre (1955)
- Marasmius amomi Petch (1948)
- Marasmius amygdalosporus Manim. & Leelav. (1988)
- Marasmius andasibensis Antonín & Buyck (2006)
- Marasmius angustilamellatus Y.S.Tan & Desjardin (2009) – Peninsular Malaysia
- Marasmius anisocystidiatus Antonín, Desjardin & H.Gsell (1992)
- Marasmius antarcticus Speg. (1888)
- Marasmius apatelius Singer (1964)
- Marasmius apogonus Singer (1977)
- Marasmius aporpohyphes Singer (1965) - name changed to Gymnopus aporpohyphes (Singer) Tkalčec & Mešić (2013)
- Marasmius aporpus Singer (1969)
- Marasmius araneocephalus Wannathes, Desjardin & Lumyong (2009) – Thailand
- Marasmius araucariae Singer (1965)
- Marasmius arborescens (Henn.) Beeli (1928)
- Marasmius argentinensis Speg. (1926)
- Marasmius arimana Dennis (1951)
- Marasmius aripoensis (Dennis) Singer (1965)
- Marasmius armeniacus Gilliam (1975)
- Marasmius artocarpi Corner (1996)
- Marasmius arundinaceus Velen. (1927)
- Marasmius ascendens Petch (1948)
- Marasmius asemiformis Singer (1989)
- Marasmius asiaticus Mešic & Tkalčec (2010)
- Marasmius aspilocephalus Singer (1965)
- Marasmius ater Singer (1976)
- Marasmius atlanticus Singer (1976)
- Marasmius atroalbus Henn. (1895)
- Marasmius atrocastaneus G.Stev. (1964)
- Marasmius atroincrustatus Singer (1976)
- Marasmius atropurpureus Murrill (1915)
- Marasmius atrorubens (Berk.) Sacc. (1887)
- Marasmius aucubae Neda (1998) - name changed to Cryptomarasmius aucubae (Neda) T.S. Jenkinson & Desjardin (2014)
- Marasmius auklandicus Henn. (1896)
- Marasmius aurantiacus I.Hino (1943)
- Marasmius aurantiobasalis Desjardin & E. Horak (1997)
- Marasmius aurantioferrugineus Hongo (1965)
- Marasmius aurantiostipitatus Antonín & P.Roberts (2004)
- Marasmius auratus Wannathes, Desjardin & Lumyong (2009) – Thailand
- Marasmius auriformis Henn. (1897)
- Marasmius australis Z.S.Bi & T.H.Li (1987)
- Marasmius austrorotula Singer (1969)
- Marasmius aztecus Singer (1976)

== B ==
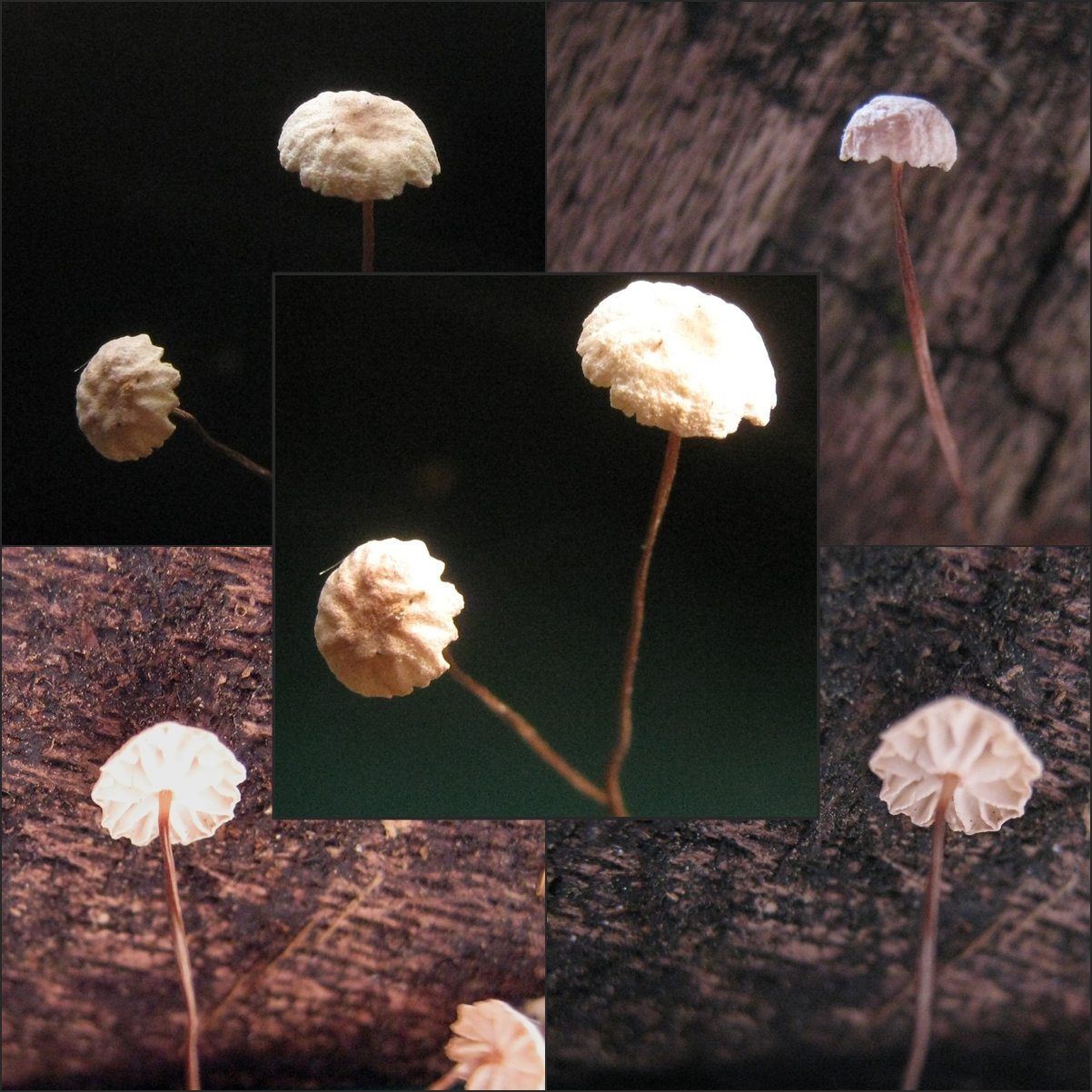
Marasmius bulliardii

- Marasmius bactrosporus Singer (1965) - name changed to Gymnopus bactrosporus (Singer) Mešić & Tkalčec (2013)
- Marasmius badiceps Peck (1897)
- Marasmius badiiceps Corner (1996)
- Marasmius baeocephalus Singer (1976)
- Marasmius bahamensis Murrill (1915)
- Marasmius balingensis Corner (1996)
- Marasmius bambusae (Pat.) Sacc. & Trotter (1912)
- Marasmius bambusiniformis Singer (1976)
- Marasmius bambusinus Fr. (1838)
- Marasmius barbatus Velen. (1939)
- Marasmius barombiensis Henn. (1895)
- Marasmius basicarneus Corner (1996)
- Marasmius bathomphalus Singer (1989)
- Marasmius batistae Singer (1965)
- Marasmius baumannii Henn. (1897)
- Marasmius beelianus Singer (1964)
- Marasmius bekolacongoli Beeli (1928)
- Marasmius bellipes Morgan (1905)
- Marasmius bellus Berk. (1856)
- Marasmius benecystidiatus Corner (1996)
- Marasmius beniensis Singer (1965)
- Marasmius berambutanus Desjardin, Retn. & E.Horak (2000)
- Marasmius berteroi (Lév.) Murrill (1915)
- Marasmius bezerrae Singer (1976)
- Marasmius bingaensis Singer (1964)
- Marasmius bipindeensis Henn. (1897)
- Marasmius boliviae Singer (1965)
- Marasmius bondoi Wannathes, Desjardin & Lumyong (2009) – Thailand
- Marasmius borealis Gilliam (1975)
- Marasmius brachypus Speg. (1898)
- Marasmius brachysporus Singer (1989)
- Marasmius brevicollus Corner (1996)
- Marasmius bromeliacearum Singer (1952)
- Marasmius bruchianus Speg. (1926)
- Marasmius brunneicrenulatus Corner (1996)
- Marasmius brunneimarginatus Corner (1996)
- Marasmius brunneinanus Corner (1996)
- Marasmius brunneoolivascens Wannathes, Desjardin & Lumyong (2009) – Thailand
- Marasmius brunneoaurantiacus Antonín & Buyck (2006)
- Marasmius brunneocinctus Singer (1976)
- Marasmius brunneodiscus Pegler (1968)
- Marasmius brunneolus (Beeli) Singer (1964)
- Marasmius brunneoniger Antonín & De Kesel (2013)
- Marasmius brunneospermus Har.Takah. (1999)
- Marasmius brunneostriatus Petch (1948)
- Marasmius bubalinus Pegler (1966)
- Marasmius buchwaldii Henn. (1900)
- Marasmius bulliardii Quél. (1878)
- Marasmius burkillii (Massee) Manjula (1983)
- Marasmius bururiensis Antonín (2003)
- Marasmius buxi Fr. (1872)
- Marasmius buxicola Kalamees (1986)
- Marasmius buzae Dennis (1961)
- Marasmius buzungolo Singer (1964)

== C ==
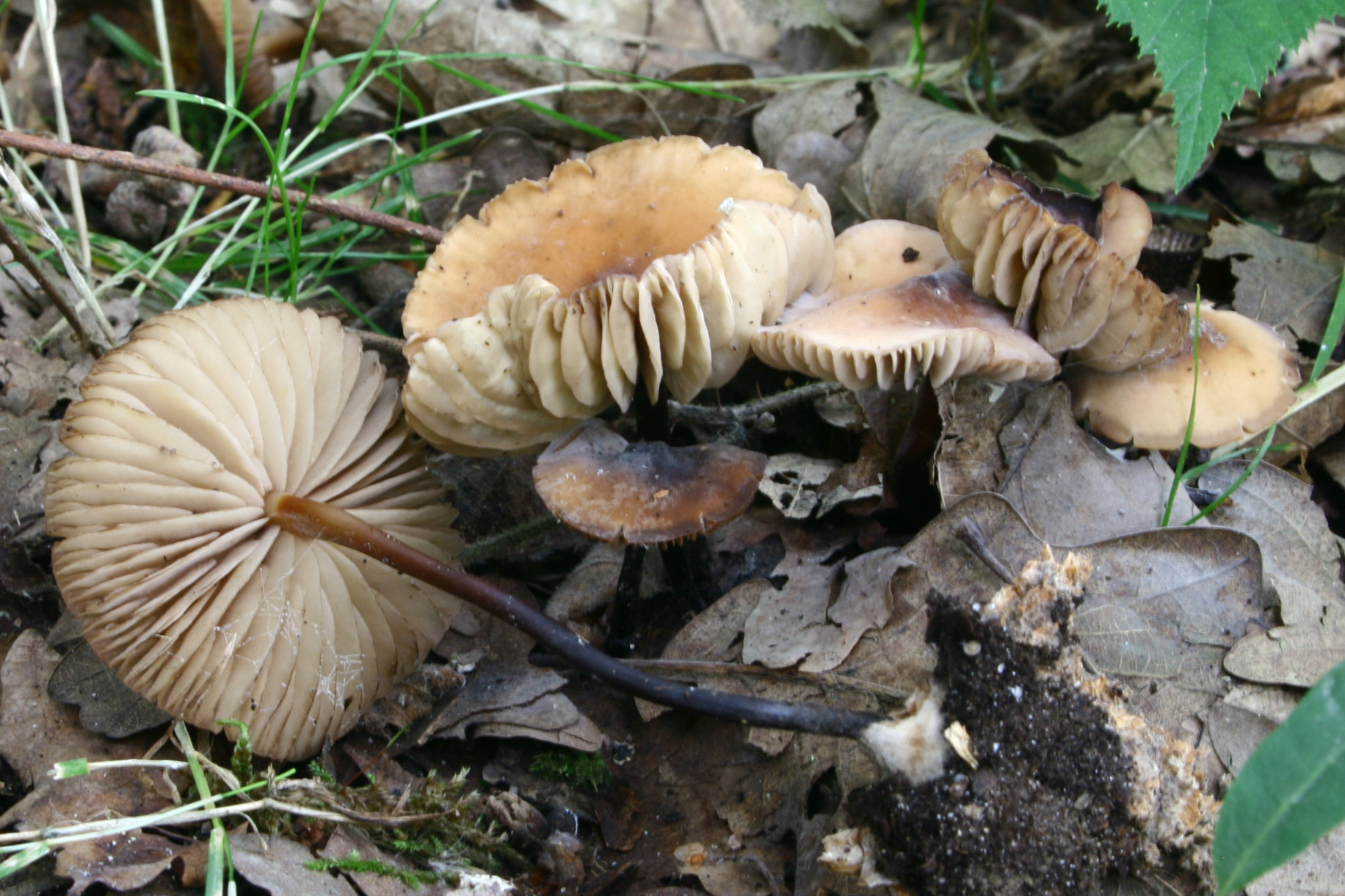
Marasmius cohaerens

- Marasmius caesius Murrill (1940)
- Marasmius caespitosus Peck (1873)
- Marasmius cafeyen Wannathes, Desjardin & Lumyong (2009) – Thailand
- Marasmius calhouniae Singer (1989)
- Marasmius caliensis Singer (1976)
- Marasmius callicarpellus Murrill (1946)
- Marasmius calopodioides Henn. (1899)
- Marasmius calvocystidiatus D.L. Komura & J.S. Oliveira (2016)
- Marasmius camerunensis Antonín & Mossebo (2003)
- Marasmius campanulatus Peck (1872
- Marasmius campinaranae Singer (1989)
- Marasmius canalipes Tkalcec & Mešic (2010)
- Marasmius cantharelloides Henn. (1897)
- Marasmius caperatus Berk. (1851)
- Marasmius capitatus Har.Takah. (2000)
- Marasmius carcharus Singer (1964)
- Marasmius caricicola Kauffman (1915)
- Marasmius caricinus Velen. (1939)
- Marasmius carminis Singer (1965)
- Marasmius carneicolor Corner (1996)
- Marasmius carneoniger Corner (1996)
- Marasmius carneotinctus Singer (1976)
- Marasmius carpenterianus Singer (1959)
- Marasmius carpophilus Singer (1937)
- Marasmius caryotae (Berk.) Petch (1947)
- Marasmius cascadensis Garrido (1988)
- Marasmius castaneophilus Isiloglu, Alli, Solak & Watling (2009)
- Marasmius castaneovelutinus Henn. (1905)
- Marasmius castanicolor Penn. (1915)
- Marasmius castellanoi Singer (1976)
- Marasmius catervatus Massee (1892)
- Marasmius caucasicus Singer (1937)
- Marasmius cavipes Velen. (1939)
- Marasmius cecropiae Dennis (1961)
- Marasmius cecropiformis Antonín & Hauskn. (2006)
- Marasmius celtibericus G.Moreno & Raitv. (1998)
- Marasmius cenospilus Singer (1982)
- Marasmius centroamericanus Singer (1989)
- Marasmius cepistipes Henn. & E.Nyman (1899)
- Marasmius cerussatus Pat. (1903)
- Marasmius cervinus Henn. (1897) - name changed to Gymnopus cervinus (Henn.) Desjardin & B.A. Perry (2017)
- Marasmius chiapasensis Singer (1976)
- Marasmius chordalis Fr. (1838)
- Marasmius chrysoblepharis Singer (1976)
- Marasmius chrysocephalus Singer (1976)
- Marasmius cibarius Singer (1976)
- Marasmius ciliatomarginatus Desjardin (1989)
- Marasmius ciliatus Pegler (1983)
- Marasmius cineraceus Petch (1948)
- Marasmius cinereoalbus Murrill (1915)
- Marasmius cinereoflavidus Henn. (1901)
- Marasmius cinnamomeus Cleland (1934) - name changed to Mycetinis cinnamomeus (Cleland) R.H. Petersen & Desjardin (2017)
- Marasmius citrinus Henn. (1895)
- Marasmius cladophyllus Berk. (1856)
- Marasmius clitocybiformis (Henn. (1904)
- Marasmius coarctatus Wannathes, Desjardin & Lumyong (2009) – Thailand
- Marasmius coccineatus Bat. (1957
- Marasmius cohaerens (Pers.) Cooke & Quél. (1878)
- Marasmius coklatus Desjardin, Retn. & E.Horak (2000)
- Marasmius colimensis Murrill (1915)
- Marasmius collinus (Scop.) Singer (1942)
- Marasmius colorimarginatus Antonín (2003)
- Marasmius conchiformis J.S. Oliveira & Capelari (2014)
- Marasmius confertus Berk. & Broome (1873)
- Marasmius congoanus Pat. (1889)
- Marasmius conicoparvus Antonín, C.Sharp & Stubbe (2013)
- Marasmius conquistensis Singer (1965)
- Marasmius convoluticeps Singer (1976)
- Marasmius coprophilus Speg. (1926)
- Marasmius corbariensis (Roum.) Sacc. (1911) - name changed to Cryptomarasmius corbariensis (Roum.) T.S. Jenkinson & Desjardin (2014)
- Marasmius corneri Wannathes, Desjardin & Lumyong (2007) – Thailand
- Marasmius coronatus Petch (1916)
- Marasmius corrugatiformis Singer (1964)
- Marasmius corrugatus (Pat.) Sacc. (1902)
- Marasmius costaricensis Singer (1989)
- Marasmius crassitunicatus de Meijer (2009)
- Marasmius cremeopileatus Antonín & C.Sharp (2006)
- Marasmius cremeus Wannathes, Desjardin & Lumyong (2007) – Thailand
- Marasmius crescentiae Murrill (1915) - name changed to Cryptomarasmius crescentiae (Murrill) T.S. Jenkinson & Desjardin (2014)
- Marasmius crinipes Antonín, Ryoo & H.D.Shin (2012)
- Marasmius crinis-equi F.Muell. ex Kalchbr. (1880)
- Marasmius crispus Henn. (1897)
- Marasmius croceus G.Stev. (1964)
- Marasmius cryptocystidiatus Corner (1996)
- Marasmius cryptomeriae S.Imai (1941)
- Marasmius cryptotrichus Singer (1976)
- Marasmius cuatrecasasii Singer (1976)
- Marasmius culmisedus Singer (1952)
- Marasmius cundinamarcae Singer (1976)
- Marasmius cupreostipes Wannathes, Desjardin & Lumyong (2009) – Thailand
- Marasmius cupulicola Métrod (1954)
- Marasmius curreyi Berk. & Broome (1879)
- Marasmius cyaneomarginatus Corner (1996)
- Marasmius cyathula Henn. (1895)
- Marasmius cylindraceocampanulatus Henn. (1900)
- Marasmius cyperinus Speg. (1926)
- Marasmius cyphella Dennis & D.A.Reid (1957)
- Marasmius cyphelloides Henn. (1897)
- Marasmius cyrillaedis Dennis (1968)
- Marasmius cystidiatus S.A. Sharafudheen & Manim. (2018)
- Marasmius cystidioccultus J.S.Oliveira & Capelari (2012) – Brazil
- Marasmius cystidiophorus Dennis (1951)
- Marasmius cystidiosus (A.H.Sm. & Hesler) Gilliam (1976)

== D ==
- Marasmius dahlii Henn. (1898)
- Marasmius dasypus Speg. (1909)
- Marasmius dauliporpus Singer (1989)
- Marasmius davidii Antonín (2003)
- Marasmius decens Herp. (1912)
- Marasmius decipiens Halling, Desjardin & Tish (1985)
- Marasmius defibulatus Singer (1959)
- Marasmius deficiens Corner (1996)
- Marasmius delectans Morgan (1905)
- Marasmius delicatulus Wannathes, Desjardin & Lumyong (2009) – Thailand
- Marasmius delicatus (G.Stev.) E.Horak (1971)
- Marasmius dendrosetosus Shay & Desjardin (2017)
- Marasmius detonianus Sacc. & Cub. (1887)
- Marasmius dicandinus Desjardin, Retn. & E. Horak (2000) - name changed to Cryptomarasmius dicandinus (Desjardin, Retn. & E. Horak) T.S. Jenkinson & Desjardin (2014)
- Marasmius dichromopus Speg. (1926)
- Marasmius dicotyledoneus (Singer) Singer (1976)
- Marasmius dictyocephalus Desjardin & E.Horak (1997)
- Marasmius digilioi Singer (1952)
- Marasmius diminutivus Y.S.Tan, Desjardin & Vikinesw. (2009) – Peninsular Malaysia
- Marasmius dimiticus Corner (1996)
- Marasmius dimorphus C.Puccin. & Capelari (2006)
- Marasmius discipes Henn. (1895)
- Marasmius discoideus Henn. (1895)
- Marasmius discopus Massee (1902)
- Marasmius dispersus Corner (1996)
- Marasmius disseminatus Velen. (1939)
- Marasmius ditopotrama Singer (1965)
- Marasmius dodecaphyllus Singer (1965)
- Marasmius domesticus Murrill (1939)
- Marasmius dryinus Singer (1990)
- Marasmius dysodes Singer (1965)

== E ==
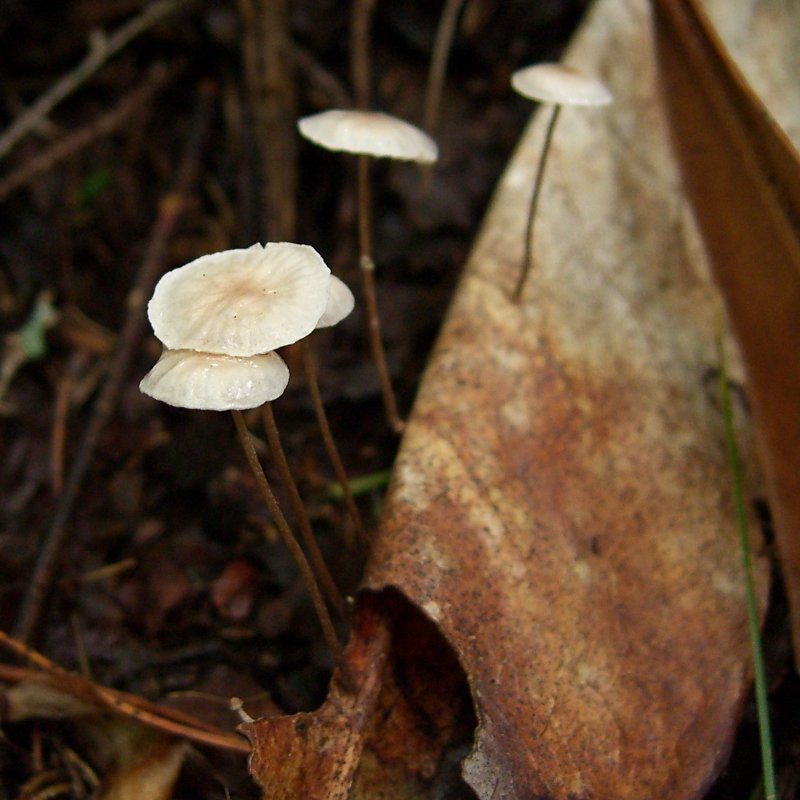
Marasmius epiphyllus

- Marasmius ealaensis Beeli (1928)
- Marasmius earlei Murrill (1915)
- Marasmius echinatulus Singer (1959)
- Marasmius echinosphaerus Singer (1964)
- Marasmius echinulatus (Murrill) Sacc. & Trotter (1925)
- Marasmius edodoides Corner (1996)
- Marasmius edwallianus Henn. (1900)
- Marasmius elaeicola Henn. (1901)
- Marasmius elaeocephalus Singer (1964)
- Marasmius elatus (Pat.) Sacc. & Trotter (1912)
- Marasmius elegans (Cleland) Grgur. (1997)
- Marasmius elegantioides Bat. (1952)
- Marasmius ellipsoidosporus Ash.Kumar, Singer & S.L. Stephenson (1991)
- Marasmius elongatipes Peck (1882)
- Marasmius englerianus Henn. (1895)
- Marasmius eorotula Singer (1976)
- Marasmius epelaeus Singer (1965)
- Marasmius epifagus Gilliam (1975)
- Marasmius epiphylloides (Rea) Sacc. & Trotter (1925)
- Marasmius epiphyllus (Pers.) Fr. (1838)
- Marasmius epirhododendron Kalamees (1986)
- Marasmius episemus Singer (1964)
- Marasmius epodius Bres. (1881)
- Marasmius erumpens Massee (1898)
- Marasmius eucladopus Singer (1965)
- Marasmius euosmus Singer (1959)
- Marasmius excentripes S.Ito & S.Imai (1939)
- Marasmius exiguus Singer (1969)
- Marasmius exillimus Corner (1996)
- Marasmius exocarpi Berk. (1881)
- Marasmius exustoides Desjardin & E. Horak (1997) - name changed to Cryptomarasmius exustoides (Desjardin & E. Horak) T.S. Jenkinson & Desjardin (2014)
- Marasmius eyssartieri Antonín & Buyck (2006)

== F ==
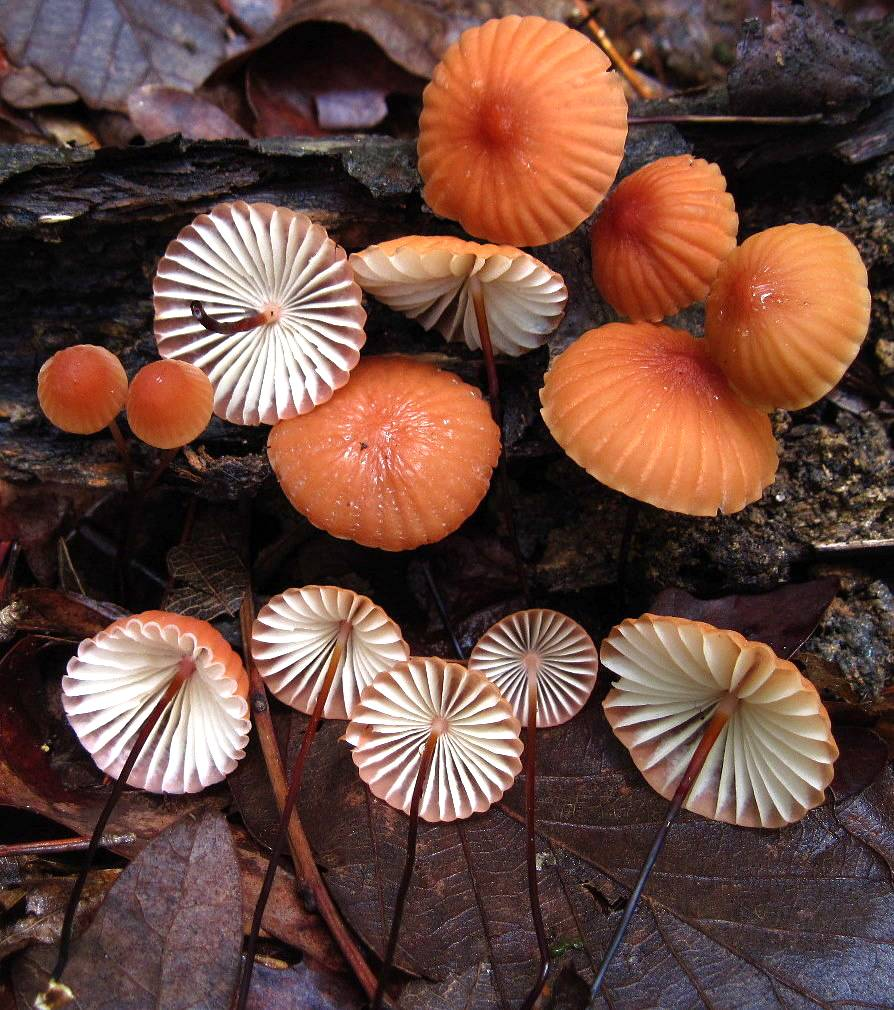
Marasmius fulvoferrugineus

- Marasmius fagesidus Velen. (1947)
- Marasmius fagi (Kalamees) Kalamees (1989)
- Marasmius falcatipes Desjardin (1989)
- Marasmius farinolens Corner (1996)
- Marasmius fasciculatus Beeli (1928)
- Marasmius favoloides Henn. (1895)
- Marasmius favrei Antonín (1991)
- Marasmius felix Morgan (1906)
- Marasmius ferruginacies Antonín (2004)
- Marasmius ferrugineus Berk. (1843)
- Marasmius ferruginoides Antonín (2004)
- Marasmius fiardii Singer (1983)
- Marasmius fibrillosipes Corner (1996)
- Marasmius filipes Peck (1872)
- Marasmius fimetarius Velen. (1939)
- Marasmius fishii G. Stev. & G.M. Taylor (1964) - name changed to Cryptomarasmius fishii (G. Stev. & G.M. Taylor) T.S. Jenkinson & Desjardin (2014)
- Marasmius fissuratus Chun Y. Deng, Antonín & T.H. Li (2015)
- Marasmius flabellatus Henn. (1901)
- Marasmius flavidulibrunneus Corner (1996)
- Marasmius flavidulus Henn. (1901)
- Marasmius flavus Singer (1964)
- Marasmius fleischerianus Henn. (1899)
- Marasmius flexipes Manim. & Leelav. (1987)
- Marasmius floridanus Murrill (1940)
- Marasmius flotoviophilus Singer (1965)
- Marasmius foliicola Singer ex Singer (1976)
- Marasmius foliiphilus Antonín (2003)
- Marasmius friesianus Henn. (1895)
- Marasmius fuligineo-ochraceus J.J. Oliveira (2016)
- Marasmius fuligineorotula Singer (1965)
- Marasmius fulvipes Corner (1996)
- Marasmius fulvoferrugineus Gilliam (1976)
- Marasmius fulvovelutinus Beeli (1928)
- Marasmius funalis Har. Takah. (2002) - name changed to Gymnopus funalis (Har. Takah.) Antonín, Ryoo & Ka (2014)
- Marasmius funiculosus Corner (1996)
- Marasmius furcatus Velen. (1939)
- Marasmius furfuraceus Killerm. (1933)
- Marasmius fuscirugosus Corner (1996)
- Marasmius fusicystidiosus Antonín, Ryoo & H.D.Shin (2010)
- Marasmius fusicystis Singer (1952)

== G ==
- Marasmius galbinus T.H.Li & Chun Y.Deng (2011)
- Marasmius galeraeformis Velen. (1939)
- Marasmius ganyao Wannathes, Desjardin & Lumyong (2009) – Thailand
- Marasmius gardneri Singer (1959)
- Marasmius gelatinosipes Desjardin & E.Horak (1997)
- Marasmius geophyllus Henn. (1901)
- Marasmius glabellus Peck (1873)
- Marasmius glaucopus (Pat.) Sacc. & D.Sacc. (1905)
- Marasmius gogolensis Henn. (1894)
- Marasmius gomezii Singer (1989)
- Marasmius goossensiae Beeli (1928)
- Marasmius gracilichorda Corner (1996)
- Marasmius gracillimitenax Corner (1996)
- Marasmius gracillimus Henn. (1897)
- Marasmius graminicola Speg. (1898)
- Marasmius graminipes Wannathes, Desjardin & Lumyong (2009) – Thailand
- Marasmius graminum (Lib.) Berk. (1860)
- Marasmius grandisetulosus Singer (1964)
- Marasmius grandisporus Henn. (1897)
- Marasmius grandiviridis Wannathes, Desjardin & Lumyong (2009)
- Marasmius gregarius Peck (1896)
- Marasmius griseoflavus Henn. (1901)
- Marasmius griseofuscescens Singer (1976)
- Marasmius griseoradiatus Desjardin & Ovrebo (2006) – Panama
- Marasmius griseoroseus (Mont.) Singer (1976)
- Marasmius griseoviolaceus Petch (1948)
- Marasmius guanacastensis Singer (1989)
- Marasmius guatopoensis Dennis (1961)
- Marasmius guzmanianus Singer (1976)
- Marasmius gypseus Retn. (2010)

== H ==
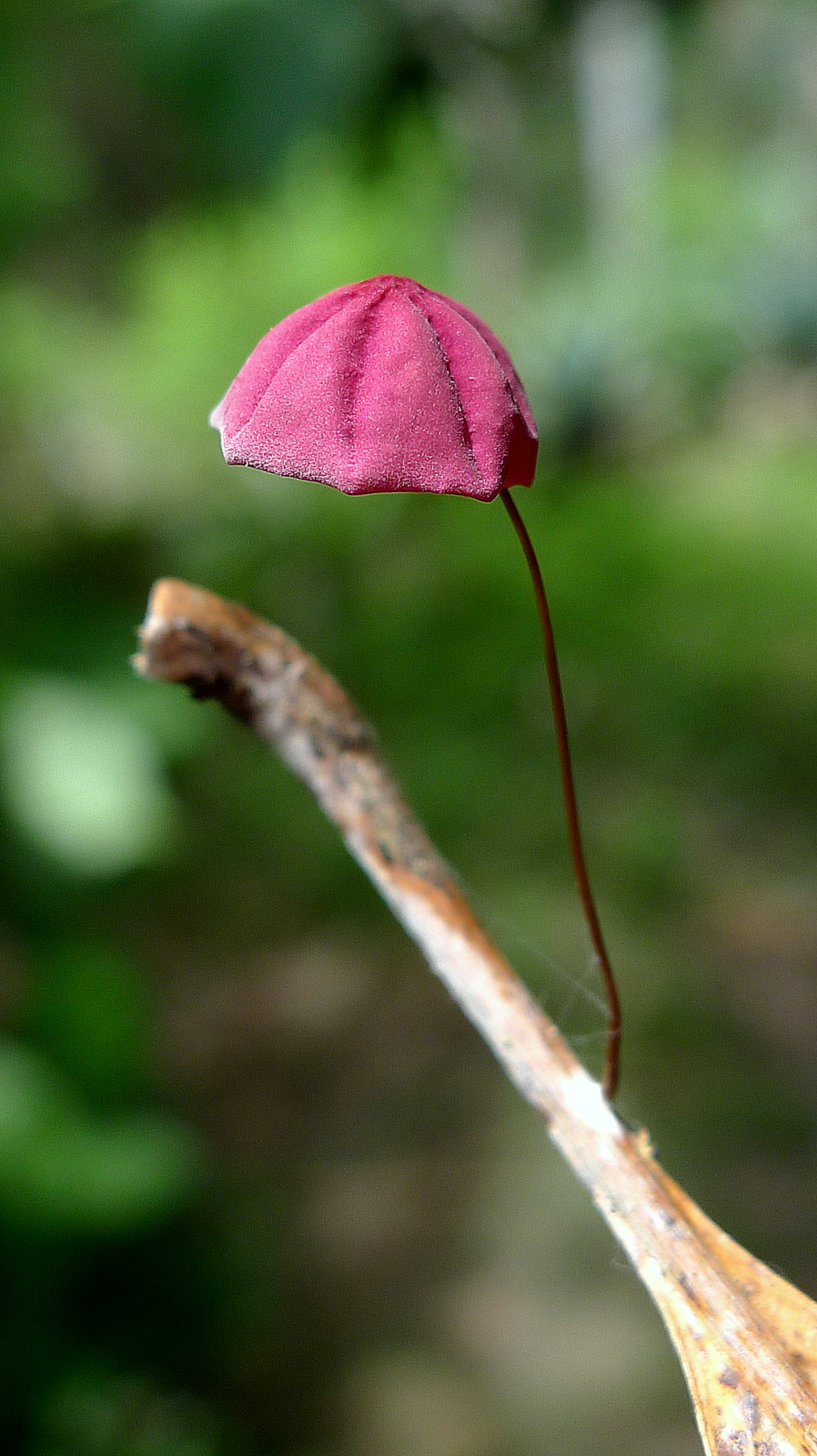
Marasmius haematocephalus

- Marasmius haediniformis Singer (1964)
- Marasmius haematocephalus (Mont.) Fr. (1838)
- Marasmius hainanensis T.H.Li (1994)
- Marasmius halimunensis Desjardin, Retn. & E.Horak (2000)
- Marasmius hautefeuillei Pat. & Demange (1910)
- Marasmius hawaiensis Henn. (1899)
- Marasmius heinemannianus Antonín (1999)
- Marasmius heliomyces Murrill (1940)
- Marasmius hellebori-corsici Romagn. (1978)
- Marasmius helvelloides Henn. & E.Nyman (1899)
- Marasmius helvoloides Singer (1976)
- Marasmius hemileucus (Sacc.) Murrill (1915)
- Marasmius hemimycena Singer (1965)
- Marasmius hemisphaericus Murrill (1946)
- Marasmius hendecaphyllus Singer (1989)
- Marasmius herbisedus Velen. (1939)
- Marasmius heterochellus Singer (1965)
- Marasmius hexaphyllus Singer (1989)
- Marasmius highlandsensis Antonín (1993)
- Marasmius hinnuleiformis Murrill (1915)
- Marasmius hioramii Murrill (1915)
- Marasmius horridulus Singer (1986)
- Marasmius hortorum Corner (1996)
- Marasmius hudsonii (Pers.) Fr. (1838)
- Marasmius hyalinotrichus Singer (1965)
- Marasmius hydropodoides Singer (1989)
- Marasmius hygrocybiformis Chun Y.Deng & T.H.Li 2012)
- Marasmius hylaeae Singer (1976)
- Marasmius hylaeicola Singer (1976)
- Marasmius hymeniicephalus (Speg.) Singer (1952

== I ==
- Marasmius idroboi Singer (1976)
- Marasmius iguazuensis Singer (1952)
- Marasmius ilicicola Desjardin (1989)
- Marasmius ilicis Singer (1954)) - name changed to Cryptomarasmius ilicis (Singer) T.S. Jenkinson & Desjardin (2014)
- Marasmius imitarius Wannathes, Desjardin & Lumyong (2009) – Thailand
- Marasmius inaquosi Desjardin (1992)
- Marasmius incisissimus Rick (1961)
- Marasmius indopurpureostriatus K. Das, A.K. Dutta & K. Acharya (2015)
- Marasmius infundibuliformis Corner (1996)
- Marasmius insignis I.Hino (1943)
- Marasmius insipidus Gilliam (1975)
- Marasmius insititius Fr. (1838)
- Marasmius insolitus Kiyashko & E.F. Malysheva (2014)
- Marasmius inthanonensis Wannathes, Desjardin & Lumyong (2009) – Thailand
- Marasmius inundabilis Singer (1989)
- Marasmius inversus Massee (1899)
- Marasmius iodactylus Singer (1989)
- Marasmius ionides Pat. (1903)
- Marasmius iras Y.S.Tan & Desjardin (2009) – Peninsular Malaysia
- Marasmius izonetae Singer (1989)

== J ==
- Marasmius jalapensis Murrill (1915)
- Marasmius jamaicensis Murrill (1915)
- Marasmius janauariensis Singer (1989)
- Marasmius jaruensis Capelari & Maziero (1988)
- Marasmius jasminodorus Wannathes, Desjardin & Lumyong (2009) – Thailand
- Marasmius jodocodos Henn. (1897)
- Marasmius juncinus Velen. (1927)

== K ==
- Marasmius kaernbachii Henn. (1898)
- Marasmius kanchingensis Y.S.Tan & Desjardin (2009) – Peninsular Malaysia
- Marasmius kanukaneus G.Stev. (1964)
- Marasmius katangensis Singer (1964)
- Marasmius kembangus Desjardin & E.Horak (2000)
- Marasmius kigwenensis Antonín (2003)
- Marasmius koae Desjardin & Hemmes (2011)
- Marasmius koreanus Antonín, Ryoo & H.D.Shin (2012)
- Marasmius kroumirensis (Pat.) Sacc. (1899) - name changed to Cryptomarasmius kroumirensis (Pat.) T.S. Jenkinson & Desjardin (2014)
- Marasmius kuthubutheenii Y.S.Tan, Desjardin, Vikinesw. & N.Abdullah (2009) – Peninsular Malaysia

== L ==
- Marasmius lacteoides Antonín (2003)
- Marasmius laetus Rick (1961)
- Marasmius lanaripes Cooke & Massee (1889)
- Marasmius lanatus (Schumach.) Morgan (1905)
- Marasmius lapidicola Velen. (1939)
- Marasmius laricinus Velen. (1920)
- Marasmius latepileatus Antonín & C.Sharp (2003)
- Marasmius lateritiosulcatus S.Ito & S.Imai (1939)
- Marasmius lateritius Petch (1948)
- Marasmius laticlavatus Wannathes, Desjardin & Lumyong (2009)
- Marasmius latiusculospermus Singer (1976)
- Marasmius leelavathyi Manim., Tkalcec & Mešic (2010)
- Marasmius leguminosarum Singer (1965)
- Marasmius leighii A.H.Sm. (1979)
- Marasmius leptopus Peck (1903)
- Marasmius leptus Singer (1964)
- Marasmius leucophaeus Petch (1945)
- Marasmius leucorotalis Singer (1965)
- Marasmius leucozonites Singer (1965)
- Marasmius leucozonitiformis Singer (1976)
- Marasmius leveilleanus (Berk.) Sacc. (1925)
- Marasmius lignicola Velen. (1927)
- Marasmius lilacinitinctus Mešic & Tkalcec (2010)
- Marasmius lilacinoalbus Beeli (1928)
- Marasmius lilacinostriatus Henn. (1895)
- Marasmius lilacinus Henn. (1896)
- Marasmius limonispora Kauffman (1926)
- Marasmius limosus Quél. (1877)
- Marasmius linderi Singer (1948)
- Marasmius liquidambaris Singer (1976)
- Marasmius linderioides J.S. Oliveira & Capelari (2014)
- Marasmius livistonae I.Hino (1943)
- Marasmius lolema Beeli (1928)
- Marasmius lomatiae Singer (1969)
- Marasmius longicystidiatus Antonín(2003)
- Marasmius longisetosus J.S. Oliveira & Capelari (2014)
- Marasmius longistipitatus Antonín (2004)
- Marasmius longistriatus Peck (1906)
- Marasmius lotaënsis Henn. (1900)
- Marasmius louisii Singer (1964)
- Marasmius lovedalensis Antonín & Verbeken (2003)
- Marasmius lubricus J.S. Oliveira & Cortez (2016)
- Marasmius luculentus A.K. Dutta, K. Acharya & Antonín (2017)
- Marasmius ludmilae Velen. (1939)
- Marasmius luteomarginatus Desjardin, Retn. & E.Horak (2000)
- Marasmius luteostipitatus Mossebo & Antonín (2004)

== M ==
- Marasmius maasii Singer (1989)
- Marasmius macrocystidiosus A.Kiyashko & E.F.Malysheva (2014) – Russian Far East
- Marasmius macrolobieti Singer (1964)
- Marasmius macrosporus M.Zang (1979)
- Marasmius maculosus Har.Takah. (2002)
- Marasmius madagascariensis Shay & Desjardin (2017)
- Marasmius magnificus (Henn.) Singer (1945)
- Marasmius magnisetulosus Singer (1976)
- Marasmius magnisporus Murrill (1912)
- Marasmius magnoliae Singer (1945) - name changed to Cryptomarasmius magnoliae (Singer) T.S. Jenkinson & Desjardin (2014)
- Marasmius magnus A.C. Magnago & J.S. Oliveira (2016)
- Marasmius major Singer (1947)
- Marasmius makok Wannathes, Desjardin & Lumyong (2009) – Thailand
- Marasmius malesianus Corner (1996)
- Marasmius mandaiensis Corner (1996)
- Marasmius manuripiensis Singer (1965)
- Marasmius mapaniae Corner (1996)
- Marasmius maranguensis Henn. (1895)
- Marasmius marasmioides (Singer) Singer (1982)
- Marasmius marthae Singer (1959)
- Marasmius martinii Singer (1959)
- Marasmius masoniae G.Stev. (1964)
- Marasmius masseei Tkalcec & Mešic (2010)
- Marasmius matangensis Corner (1996)
- Marasmius matrisdei Singer (1965)
- Marasmius maximus Hongo (1962)
- Marasmius mazatecus Singer (1976)
- Marasmius mbalmayoensis Douanla-Meli (2008)
- Marasmius mediterraneus Corriol (2007)
- Marasmius megalospermus Singer (1965)
- Marasmius megistosporus Singer (1965)
- Marasmius megistus Singer (1964)
- Marasmius meliae J.E.Wright (1970)
- Marasmius melinocephalus Singer (1965)
- Marasmius mengoensis Pegler (1977)
- Marasmius mentakiensis Corner (1996)
- Marasmius meridionalis E.Horak & Desjardin (1994)
- Marasmius mesocephalus Singer 1989)
- Marasmius mesosporus Singer (1964)
- Marasmius michailowskoensis Henn. (1905)
- Marasmius micraster Petch (1948) - name changed to Cryptomarasmius micraster (Petch) T.S. Jenkinson & Desjardin (2014)
- Marasmius microdendron Singer (1965)
- Marasmius microhaedinus Singer (1965)
- Marasmius micromerus Corner (1996)
- Marasmius microrotalis Singer (1989)
- Marasmius midnapurensis A.K.Dutta, P.Pradhan & K.Acharya (2014) – West Bengal
- Marasmius minimus Dennis (1961)
- Marasmius minusculus Singer (1989)
- Marasmius minutissimus Peck (1875)
- Marasmius minutoides Antonín 2003)
- Marasmius minutus Peck (1875) - name changed to Cryptomarasmius minutus (Peck) T.S. Jenkinson & Desjardin (2014)
- Marasmius mirabilis Velen. (1920)
- Marasmius misionensis Singer (1965)
- Marasmius missangoënsis Pat. (1902)
- Marasmius mokfaensis Wannathes, Desjardin & Lumyong (2009)
- Marasmius molfinoanus Speg. (1926)
- Marasmius monstruosus Corner (1996)
- Marasmius montagneanus Singer (1976)
- Marasmius montanus Murrill (1915)
- Marasmius morganianus Sumst. (1914)
- Marasmius mulanjeensis Antonín (2003)
- Marasmius multifolius Peck (1915)
- Marasmius multiplex Corner (1996)
- Marasmius multivenosus Murrill (1946)
- Marasmius multivolus Corner (1996)
- Marasmius mundulus Singer (1989)
- Marasmius munsae Henn. (1898)
- Marasmius munyozii Singer (1969)
- Marasmius muramwyanensis Antonín (2003)
- Marasmius musicola Murrill (1915) – Peninsular Malaysia
- Marasmius musicolor Y.S.Tan & Desjardin (2009)
- Marasmius musisporus Desjardin & E.Horak (1997)
- Marasmius mvumae Antonín & C.Sharp (2003)
- Marasmius myocephalus Singer (1976)
- Marasmius myrciae (Pat.) Sacc. & P.Syd. (1902)

== N ==
- Marasmius nanorotalis Singer (1989)
- Marasmius nanosporus Raithelh. (2004)
- Marasmius napoensis Singer (1976)
- Marasmius naucoriiformis Corner (1996)
- Marasmius nebularum Singer (1965)
- Marasmius neglectus Singer (1976)
- Marasmius neorotula Singer (1989)
- Marasmius neosessilis Singer (1955)
- Marasmius neotropicus Mešic & Tkalcec (2010)
- Marasmius nephelogenes Singer (1990)
- Marasmius nexus Desjardin & E.Horak (1997)
- Marasmius nigriceps Corner (1996)
- Marasmius nigrodiscus (Peck) Halling (1983)
- Marasmius nigrogriseus Antonín & Buyck (2006)
- Marasmius nilgiriensis Natarajan & Raman (1981)
- Marasmius niveicolor Murrill (1915)
- Marasmius nivicola Har.Takah. (2000)
- Marasmius nocturnus Har.Takah. (2000)
- Marasmius nodulocystis Pegler (1977)
- Marasmius nogalesii Singer (1965)
- Marasmius nolaneiformis Murrill (1940)
- Marasmius notandus Corner (1996)
- Marasmius nothomyrciae Singer (1962)
- Marasmius novopommeranus Henn. (1894)
- Marasmius nugatorius Corner (1996) - name changed to Marasmiellus nugatorius (Corner) Retn. (2018)
- Marasmius nummularioides Desjardin & Y.S.Tan (2007)
- Marasmius nuptialis Morgan (1905)
- Marasmius nyikae Antonín (2003)
- Marasmius nymanianus Henn. (1899)

== O ==
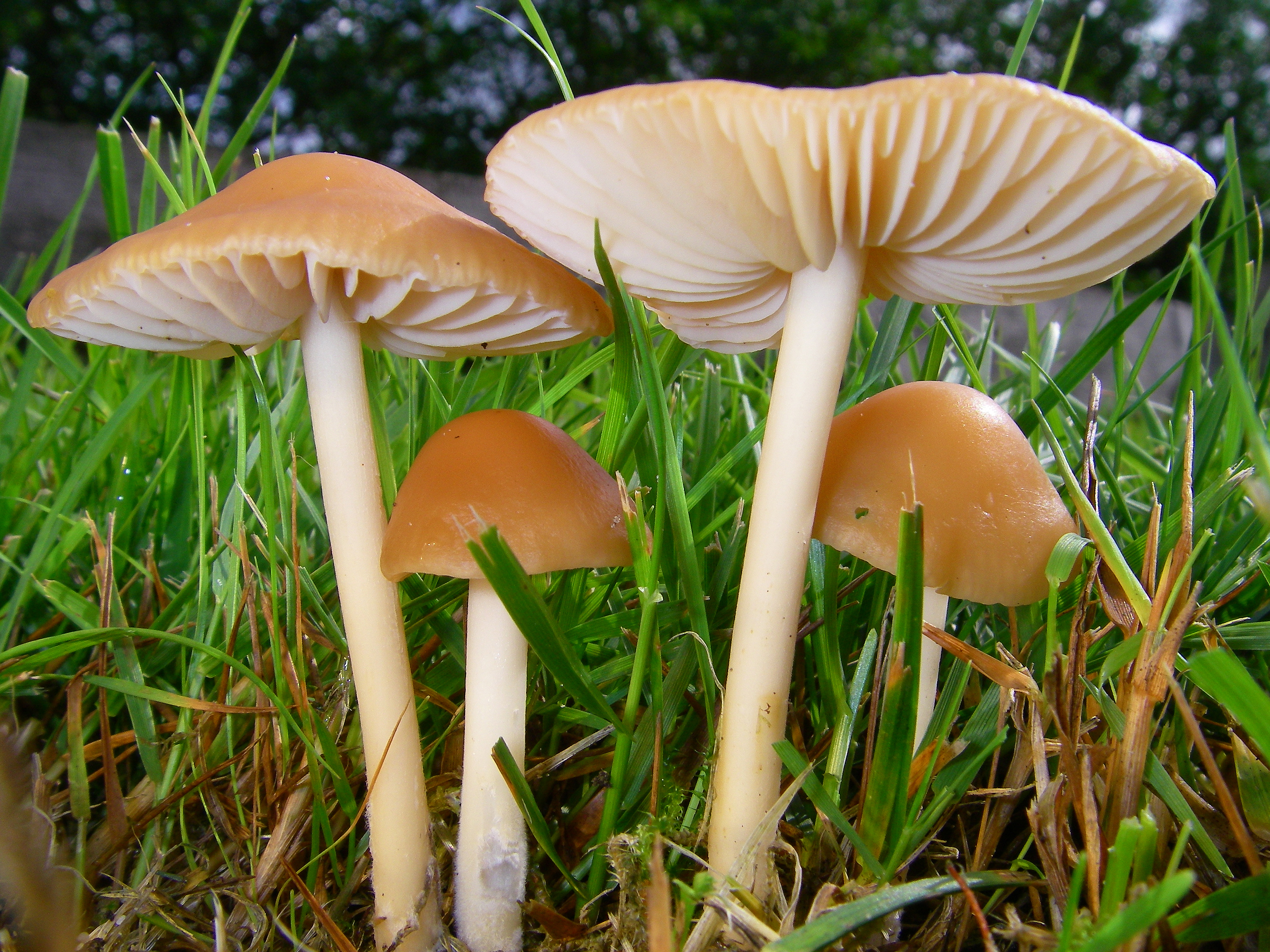
Marasmius oreades

- Marasmius oaxacanus Singer (1959)
- Marasmius obsoletus Murrill (1915)
- Marasmius obtusifolius Rea (1920)
- Marasmius occultatiformis Antonín, Ryoo & H.D.Shin (2012)
- Marasmius occultatus Har.Takah. (2000)
- Marasmius ochraceoniger Henn. (1901)
- Marasmius ochracis-niger Henn. (1901)
- Marasmius ochroleucus Desjardin & E.Horak (1997)
- Marasmius ochropoides Y.S.Tan & Desjardin (2009) – Peninsular Malaysia
- Marasmius ochropus Singer (1964)
- Marasmius octifolius Murrill (1946)
- Marasmius odoratus V.A. Farook & Manim. (2015)
- Marasmius oleiger Singer (1965)
- Marasmius olens Velen. (1939)
- Marasmius olidus Gilliam (1975) - name changed to Mycetinis olidus (Gilliam) R.H. Petersen (2017)
- Marasmius oligocystis Singer (1959)
- Marasmius olivascens Y.S.Tan & Desjardin (2009) – Peninsular Malaysia
- Marasmius olivascenticeps Singer (1976)
- Marasmius omphalinus (Pat. & Demange) Sacc. & Trotter (1912)
- Marasmius onoticus Singer ex Singer 1976)
- Marasmius opalinus Massee (1906)
- Marasmius opulentus Har.Takah. (2000)
- Marasmius oreades (Bolton) Fr. (1836)
- Marasmius orientalis Antonín, Ryoo & H.D.Shin (2010)
- Marasmius ornatus Henn. (1897)
- Marasmius otagensis G.Stev. (1964)

== P ==
- Marasmius pacificus Singer (1969) - name changed to Gymnopus pacificus (Singer) Tkalčec & Mešić (2013)
- Marasmius pallenticeps Singer (1976)
- Marasmius pallescens Murrill (1915)
- Marasmius pallidiceps Murrill (1946)
- Marasmius pallidocephalus Gilliam (1975)
- Marasmius pallidocinctus Singer (1976)
- Marasmius pallidorubens (Berk. & Broome) Petch (1945)
- Marasmius pallidosepiaceus (Henn. 1901)
- Marasmius pallidus Henn. 1897)
- Marasmius pallipes Speg. (1883)
- Marasmius palmicola Henn. (1895)
- Marasmius palmivorus Sharples (1928)
- Marasmius paludigenus Desjardin (1989)
- Marasmius pampicola Singer (1952)
- Marasmius panamensis Singer (1976)
- Marasmius pandanicola Henn. (1897)
- Marasmius pandoanus Singer (1965)
- Marasmius panelloides Corner (1996)
- Marasmius panerythrus Singer (1965)
- Marasmius pangerangensis Henn. (1899) - name changed to Marasmiellus pangerangensis (Henn.) Retn. (2018)
- Marasmius paniformis Corner (1996)
- Marasmius papyraceus Massee (1914)
- Marasmius paradoxus Henn. (1895)
- Marasmius paranaensis de Meijer 2009)
- Marasmius pararotula Singer (1965)
- Marasmius parviconicus Pegler (1982)
- Marasmius patellula Corner (1996)
- Marasmius paucifolius Murrill (1915)
- Marasmius paucilamellatus Desjardin & E. Horak (1997) - name changed to Cryptomarasmius paucilamellatus (Desjardin & E. Horak) T.S. Jenkinson & Desjardin (2014)
- Marasmius paulensis Singer 1976)
- Marasmius pauxillulus Corner (1996)
- Marasmius peckii Murrill (1915)
- Marasmius pegleri Courtec. (1984)
- Marasmius perakensis Sacc. & P.Syd. (1902)
- Marasmius pergamenus Pat. & Demange (1910)
- Marasmius perlongispermus Singer (1976)
- Marasmius perplexus Desjardin, Retn. & E.Horak (2000)
- Marasmius perpusillus Desjardin & E.Horak (1997)
- Marasmius perrarus Singer (1989)
- Marasmius perreductus Singer (1977)
- Marasmius persicinus Desjardin, Retn. & E.Horak (2000)
- Marasmius phaeocystis Singer (1976)
- Marasmius phalaricola Warcup & P.H.B.Talbot(1962)
- Marasmius phlebodiscus Desjardin & E.Horak (1997)
- Marasmius phyllophilus Peck 1907)
- Marasmius piceina Kauffman (1923)
- Marasmius piceinus Kauffman (1923)
- Marasmius pichinchensis Singer (1989)
- Marasmius pilgerodendri Singer (1965)
- Marasmius pinastri Kauffman (1923)
- Marasmius piperodora Beeli (1928)
- Marasmius platyspermus Singer (1952)
- Marasmius plenicystidiosus J.S.Oliveira & Capelari (2012)
- Marasmius pleuracanthus Singer (1965)
- Marasmius pleurotelloides Singer (1976)
- Marasmius pleurotellulus Corner (1996)
- Marasmius pleurotoides Henn. (1897)
- Marasmius plicatulus Peck (1897)
- Marasmius plumieri (Lév.) Singer (1951)
- Marasmius pluvialis Singer (1965)
- Marasmius poculiformis Corner (1992)
- Marasmius podocarpicola Pennycook (2003)
- Marasmius polychaetopus Singer (1965)
- Marasmius polycladoides Singer (1989)
- Marasmius polycystis Singer (1976)
- Marasmius polylepidis Dennis ex Singer (1965)
- Marasmius polyporoides Murrill (1915)
- Marasmius polypus (Kalchbr.) D.A.Reid (1975)
- Marasmius pometiae Corner (1996)
- Marasmius poromycenoides Singer (1965)
- Marasmius porphyreticus Petch (1948)
- Marasmius portentosus Antonín & De Kesel (2013)
- Marasmius portonovensis Singer (1965)
- Marasmius portoricensis Murrill (1915)
- Marasmius praeandinus Singer (1965)
- Marasmius praecox Singer (1959)
- Marasmius praegrandispermus Singer (1989)
- Marasmius praetortipes Murrill (1915)
- Marasmius prasiosmus (Fr.) Fr. (1838) - name changed to Mycetinis prasiosmus (Fr.) R.H. Petersen (2017)
- Marasmius pruinosifolius Murrill (1915)
- Marasmius pruinosipes Murrill (1946)
- Marasmius pseudimpudicus Murrill (1946)
- Marasmius pseudobambusinus Desjardin (1991)
- Marasmius pseudocollinus (Singer) Singer (1965)
- Marasmius pseudoconfertus T.H.Li & Chun Y.Deng (2011)
- Marasmius pseudocorrugatus Singer (1965)
- Marasmius pseudocupressiformis Singer (1989)
- Marasmius pseudocyphella Antonín & Buyck (2006)
- Marasmius pseudoeuosmus G.Y.Zheng & Z.S.Bi (1985)
- Marasmius pseudoglobularis Bon (1978)
- Marasmius pseudominutus Singer (1989)
- Marasmius pseudoniveus Singer (1965)
- Marasmius pseudopellucidus Wannathes, Desjardin & Lumyong (2009) – Thailand
- Marasmius pseudoperonatus Speg. (1898)
- Marasmius pseudopurpureostriatus Wannathes, Desjardin & Lumyong (2009)
- Marasmius pseudoquercophilus B.E.Lechner & Papin. (2011)
- Marasmius pseudosetosus C.Puccin. & Capelari (2006)
- Marasmius pseudotorquescens Antonín (2004)
- Marasmius psychotriophilus Singer (1965)
- Marasmius puberistipitatus J.J. Oliveira (2016)
- Marasmius puerariae R. Kirschner (2013)
- Marasmius pulcherripes Peck (1872)
- Marasmius puniceus Thiers (1958)
- Marasmius purpureipes Corner (1996)
- Marasmius purpureisetosus Corner (1996)
- Marasmius purpureoalbus Petch (1948)
- Marasmius purpureobrunneolus Henn. (1899)
- Marasmius purpureostriatus Hongo (1958)
- Marasmius purpureotinctus Antonín & P.Roberts (2013)
- Marasmius pusilliformis Chun Y. Deng & T.H. Li (2017)
- Marasmius pusillissimus Desjardin & R.H.Petersen (1989)
- Marasmius pusillus Henn. (1898)
- Marasmius pusio Berk. & M.A.Curtis (1853)
- Marasmius puttemansii Henn. (1904)
- Marasmius pygmaeus Henn. (1897)
- Marasmius pyramidalis (Scop.) Fr. (1838)

== Q ==
- Marasmius quercuum Murrill (1946)
- Marasmius quisquiliaris Schweers (1941)

== R ==
- Marasmius radiatus Desjardin (1992)
- Marasmius radicellicola Singer (1976)
- Marasmius radicicola Velen. (1947)
- Marasmius raffillii Massee (1909)
- Marasmius ramentaceus (Pat.) Sacc. & Traverso (1911)
- Marasmius rammelooi Antonín (2004)
- Marasmius ramulinus Peck (1898)
- Marasmius reniformis Henn. (1901)
- Marasmius resinosus Sacc. (1887)
- Marasmius restrictus Corner (1996)
- Marasmius reticulatus Henn. (1901)
- Marasmius rhizomorphogeton (Singer) Singer (1976)
- Marasmius rhododendrorum Kalamees (1986)
- Marasmius rhodopurpureus Antonín, Ryoo & H.D.Shin (2012)
- Marasmius rhombisporus Desjardin & E.Horak (1997)
- Marasmius rhopalostylidis Desjardin & E.Horak (1997)
- Marasmius riawunnus Grgur. (1997)
- Marasmius rigidichordus Petch (1945) - name changed to Gymnopus rigidichordus (Petch) Tkalčec & Mešić, (2013)
- Marasmius rimuphilus Desjardin & E.Horak (1997)
- Marasmius riparius Singer (1952)
- Marasmius robertsii Antonín (2004)
- Marasmius robertsonii Singer (1965)
- Marasmius robinianus Gilliam (1976)
- Marasmius rodwayi Massee (1900)
- Marasmius rosatus B.E.Lechner & Papin. (2011)
- Marasmius rosellus Velen. (1920)
- Marasmius roseolus Henn. (1895)
- Marasmius rosulatus Desjardin & R.H.Petersen (1989)
- Marasmius rosulus Velen. (1920)
- Marasmius rotaliformis Singer (1982)
- Marasmius rotalis C. Puccin. & Capelari (2007)
- Marasmius rotaliscystidiatus C.Puccin. & Capelari (2007)
- Marasmius rotula (Scop.) Fr. (1838)
- Marasmius rotuloides Dennis (1951)
- Marasmius rubefaciens Corner (1996)
- Marasmius ruber Singer (1965)
- Marasmius rubi Kalamees (1986)
- Marasmius rubicola Velen. (1939)
- Marasmius rubiicolor Corner (1996)
- Marasmius rubricatus (Sacc.) Massee (1893)
- Marasmius rubrobrunneus Shay & Desjardin (2017)
- Marasmius rubroflavus (Theiss.) Singer (1951)
- Marasmius rubromarginatus Dennis (1951)
- Marasmius rubrophyllus Penn. (1915)
- Marasmius rubrostipitatus Antonín & P.Roberts (2004)
- Marasmius rufisulcatus Corner (1996)
- Marasmius rufo-ochraceus Petch (1948)
- Marasmius rufoaurantiacus Petch (1948)
- Marasmius rufobrunneus Henn. (1895)
- Marasmius rufomarginatus Singer (1959)
- Marasmius ruforotula Singer (1948)
- Marasmius rufus Henn. (1897)
- Marasmius rugosoelegans Cleland (1923)

== S ==
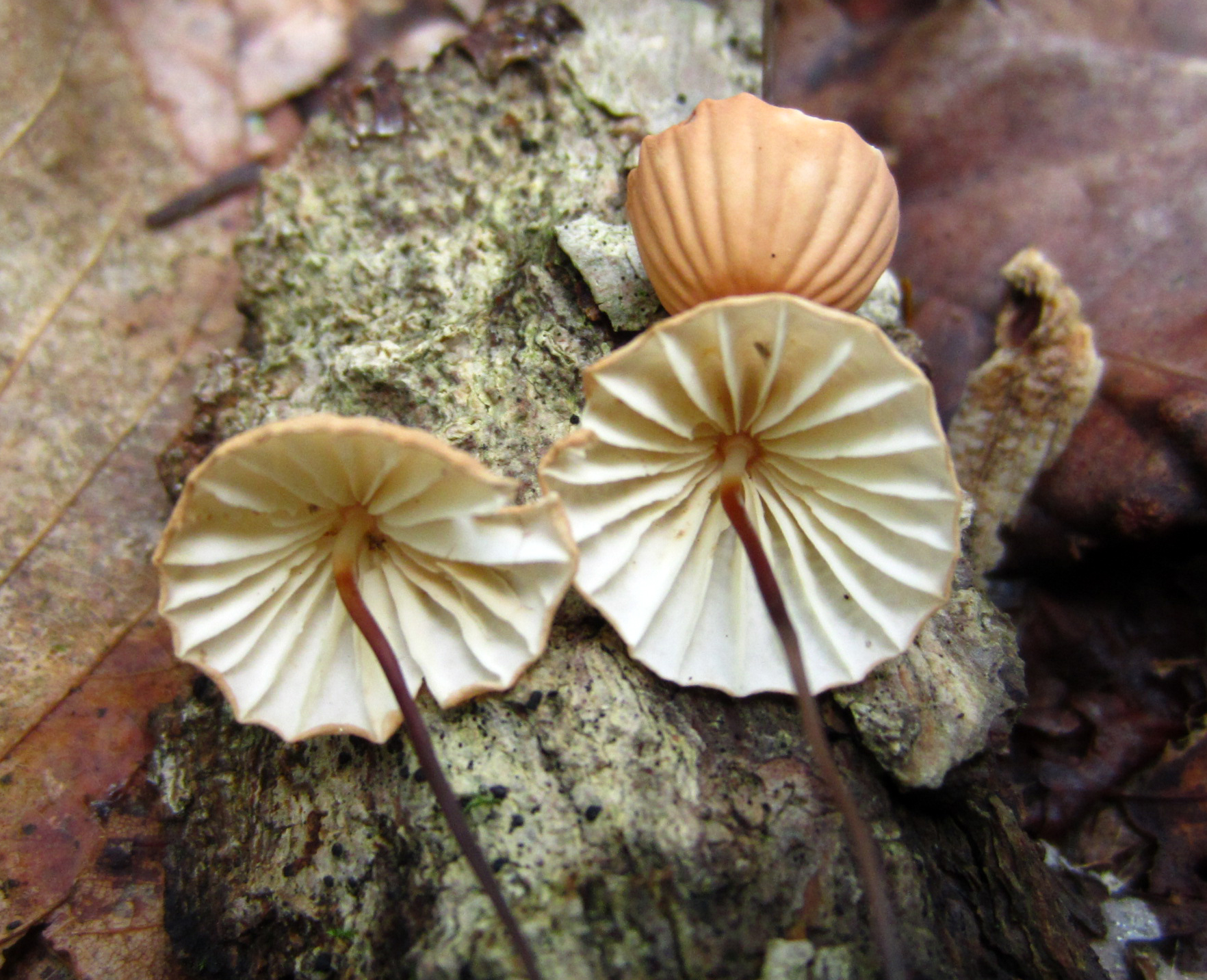
Marasmius siccus

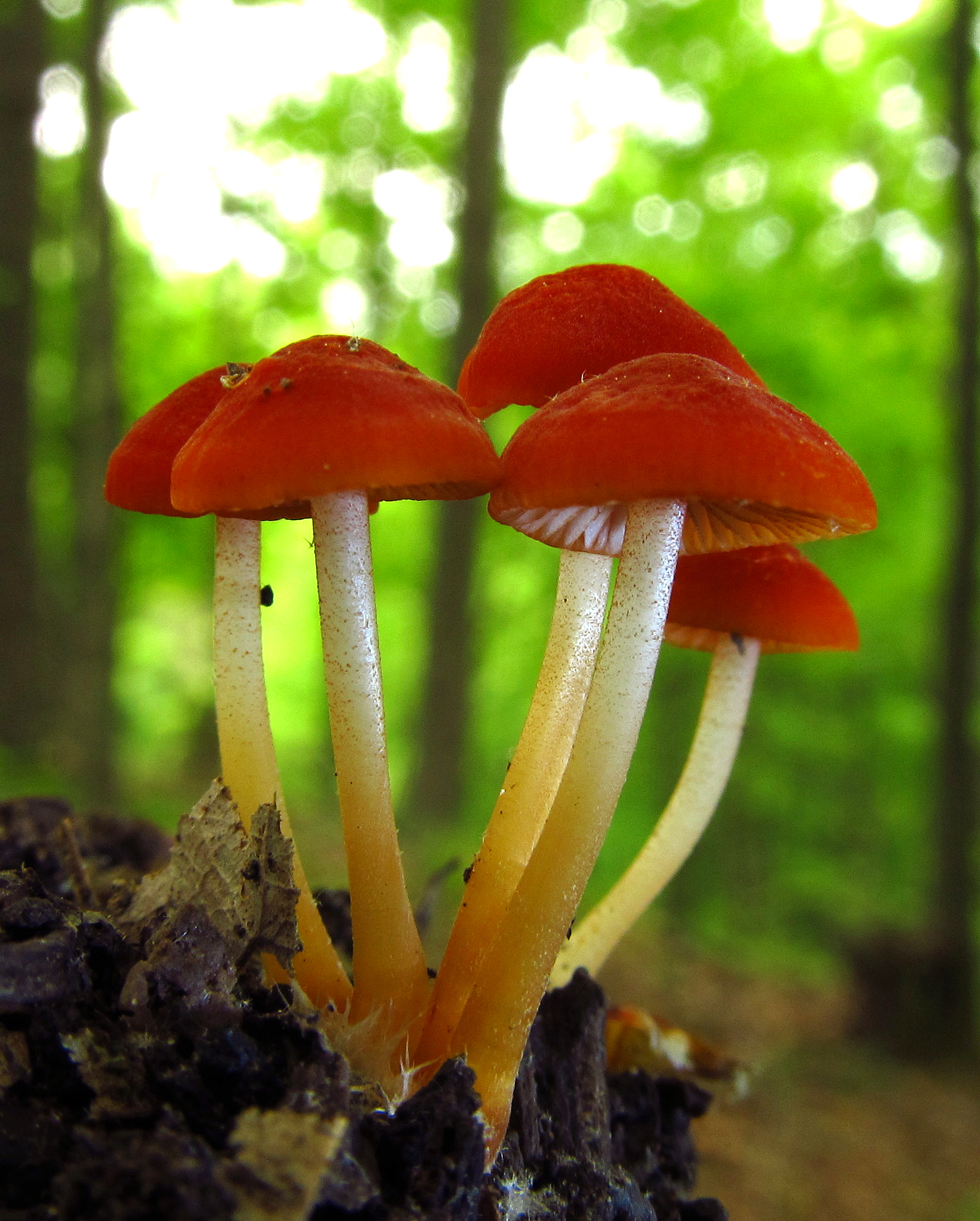
Marasmius sullivantii

- Marasmius sacchari Wakker (1896)
- Marasmius saccharinus (Batsch) Fr. (1838)
- Marasmius salignus Peck (1884)
- Marasmius sancti-xaverii Singer (1965)
- Marasmius sanguineus Cooke & Massee (1889)
- Marasmius sanguirotalis Singer (1952)
- Marasmius sasicola Har.Takah. (2002)
- Marasmius schizochaetus Desjardin, Retn. & E.Horak(2000)
- Marasmius schreursii Antonín (2003)
- Marasmius schultesii Singer (1976)
- Marasmius schweinfurthianus Henn. (1893)
- Marasmius scleronematis Singer (1989)
- Marasmius scopulatus Desjardin & Ovrebo (2006) – Panama
- Marasmius scotophysinus Singer (1965)
- Marasmius scototephrodes Singer (1976)
- Marasmius sejunctus Singer (1976)
- Marasmius selangorensis Y.S.Tan & Desjardin (2007)
- Marasmius sepiarius (Pat. & Demange) Sacc. & Trotter (1912)
- Marasmius sepiopileatus Antonín & P.Roberts (2013)
- Marasmius sessiliaffinis Singer (1959)
- Marasmius setiger Pegler (1977)
- Marasmius setosus (Sowerby) Noordel. (1987) - name changed to Rhizomarasmius setosus (Sowerby) Antonín & A. Urb. (2015)
- Marasmius setulosifolius Singer (1965)
- Marasmius setulosus Murrill (1940)
- Marasmius shideiae Singer (1989)
- Marasmius sibiricus Singer (1943)
- Marasmius sicciformis Murrill (1940)
- Marasmius siccus Schwein. ex Fr.
- Marasmius sierraleonis Beeli (1938)
- Marasmius silvicola Singer (1952)
- Marasmius singaporensis Corner (1996)
- Marasmius singeri Guzmán (1974)
- Marasmius skalae Antonín (1988)
- Marasmius sokola Shay & Desjardin (2017)
- Marasmius soliformis Murrill (1915)
- Marasmius somalomoensis Antonín (2003)
- Marasmius sordidus Massee (1910)
- Marasmius spadiceus Gilliam (1975)
- Marasmius spaniophyllus Berk. (1843)
- Marasmius sparsifolius Chun Y.Deng & T.H.Li (2012)
- Marasmius sphaerodermatoides Singer (1989)
- Marasmius sphaerodermus Speg. (1880) - name changed to Cryptomarasmius sphaerodermus (Speg.) T.S. Jenkinson & Desjardin (2014)
- Marasmius spiculosus Singer (1965)
- Marasmius spinulifer (Peck) Morgan(1905)
- Marasmius spissus Gilliam (1975)
- Marasmius splachnoides (Hornem.) Fr. (1838)
- Marasmius splitgerberi (Mont.) Singer (1965)
- Marasmius staudtii Henn. (1895)
- Marasmius stenophylloides Murrill 1946)
- Marasmius straminiceps Wannathes, Desjardin & Lumyong (2007) – Thailand
- Marasmius straminipes Peck (1873)
- Marasmius striaepileus Antonín & P.Roberts (2004)
- Marasmius strictipes (Peck) Singer (1943)
- Marasmius strigipes Beeli (1928)
- Marasmius strobiluriformis Antonín, Ryoo & H.D.Shin (2010)
- Marasmius stuhlmannii Henn. (1893)
- Marasmius subabundans Chun Y.Deng & T.H.Li (2012)
- Marasmius subagricola (Murrill) Singer (1976)
- Marasmius subaimara Z.S.Bi (1985)
- Marasmius subalbiceps Murrill (1946)
- Marasmius subalbidulus Antonín (2004)
- Marasmius subalpinus P.-A. Moreau (2007) - name changed to Mycetinis subalpinus (P.-A. Moreau) R.H. Petersen (2017)
- Marasmius subarborescens Singer (1964)
- Marasmius subarchyropus Murrill (1940)
- Marasmius subcaespitosus Raithelh. (2004)
- Marasmius subcastaneus Henn. (1897)
- Marasmius subconiatus Petch (1948)
- Marasmius subcurreyi Henn. (1901)
- Marasmius subdiminutus Corner (1996)
- Marasmius subimpudicus Henn. (1901)
- Marasmius subincarnatus Corner (1996)
- Marasmius subingratus Dennis (1951)
- Marasmius subinstitius Cleland & Cheel (1923)
- Marasmius sublanguidus Henn. (1898)
- Marasmius sublividus (Murrill) Sacc. & Trotter (1925)
- Marasmius submarginatus Singer (1989)
- Marasmius submulticeps (Murrill) Sacc. & Trotter (1925)
- Marasmius subnauseosus Kauffman (1926)
- Marasmius subomphalodes Henn. (1901)
- Marasmius subpilosus Peck (1903)
- Marasmius subplancus Henn. (1901)
- Marasmius subplexifolius Murrill (1915)
- Marasmius subprasiosmus Murrill (1940)
- Marasmius subrhodocephalus Henn. (1895)
- Marasmius subroseus Cooke & Massee (1892)
- Marasmius subrotula Murrill (1915)
- Marasmius subruforotula Singer (1964)
- Marasmius subsetiger Z.S.Bi & G.Y.Zheng (1985)
- Marasmius subsupinus Berk. (1859) - name changed to Gymnopus subsupinus (Berk.) J.A. Cooper (2014)
- Marasmius subsynodicus Murrill (1940)
- Marasmius subtangerinus Antonín, Ryoo & H.D.Shin (2012)
- Marasmius subvenosus Peck (1872)
- Marasmius subviolaceus Henn. (1897)
- Marasmius subviridiphyllus Chun Y. Deng, Y.H. Yang & T.H. Li (2013)
- Marasmius subviscidus Corner (1996)
- Marasmius sulcatus Massee (1916)
- Marasmius superabundans Murrill (1945)
- Marasmius superbus Henn. (1901)
- Marasmius suthepensis Wannathes, Desjardin & Lumyong (2009) – Thailand
- Marasmius sutliffae Peck (1905)
- Marasmius symbiotes Theiss. (1909)

== T ==
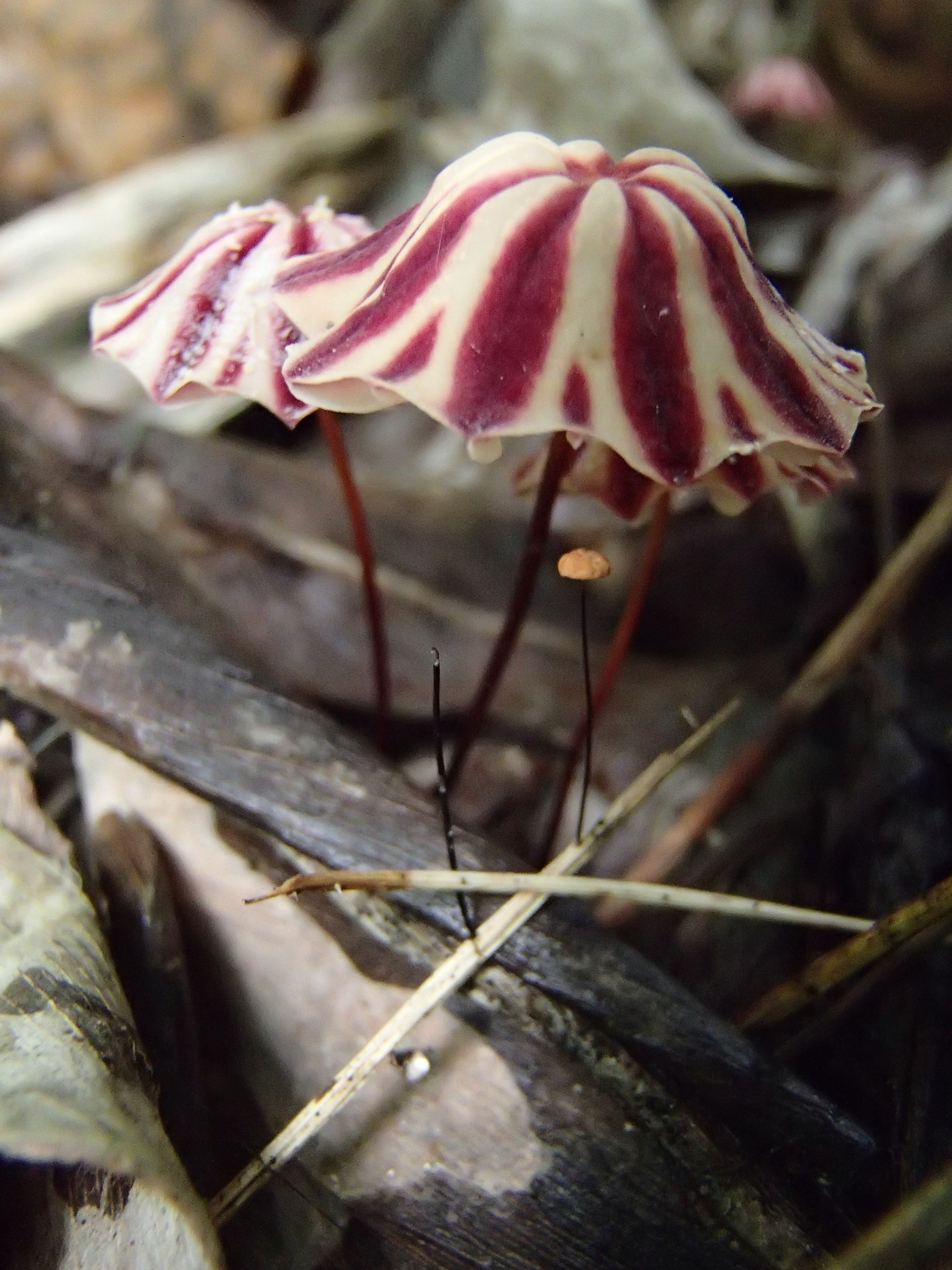
Marasmius tageticolor

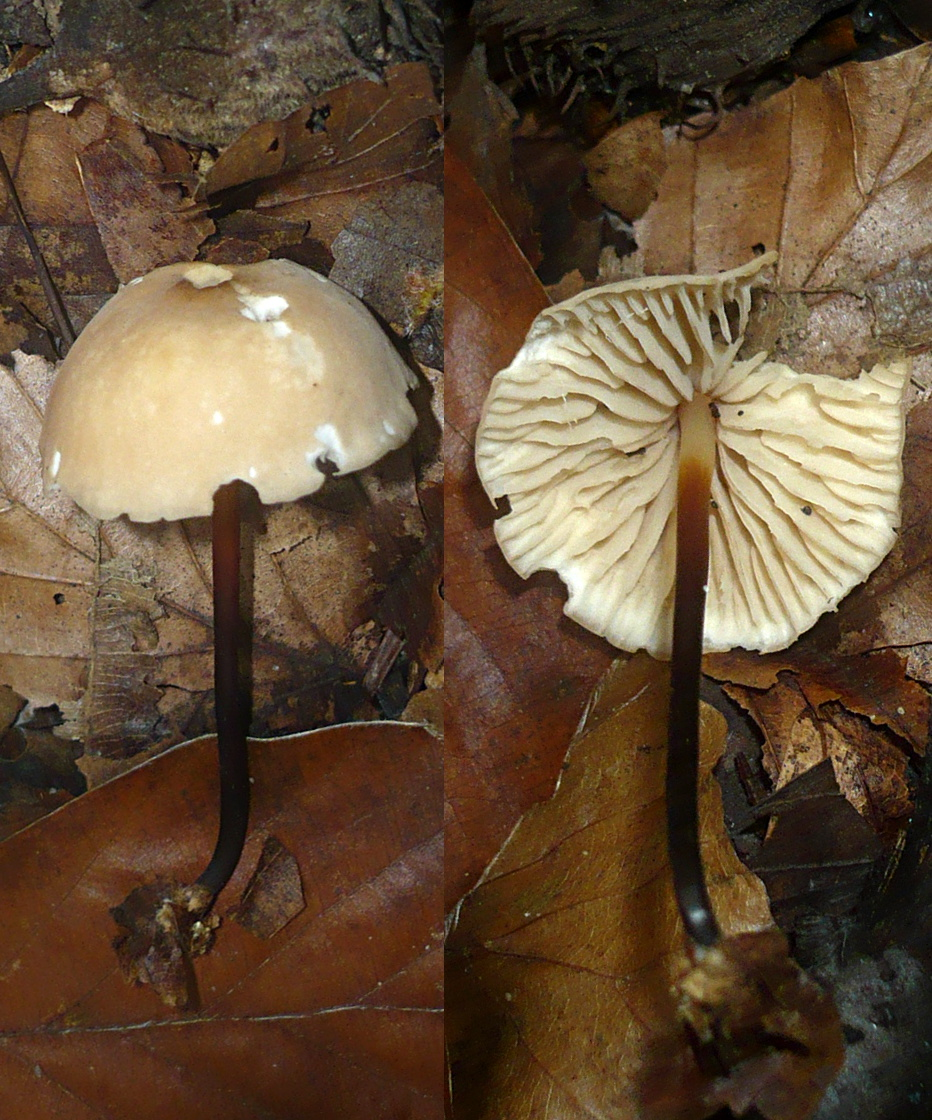
Marasmius torquescens

- Marasmius tageticolor Berk. (1856) – Mexico, Central America, South America
- Marasmius tanaensis Shay & Desjardin (2017)
- Marasmius tanougouensis Antonín (2004)
- Marasmius tantulus Wannathes, Desjardin & Lumyong (2009) – Thailand
- Marasmius tanyspermus Singer (1965)
- Marasmius tasmaniensis Singer (1989)
- Marasmius tenellulus Corner (1996)
- Marasmius tenuifolius (Murrill) Singer (1943)
- Marasmius tenuisetulosus (Singer) Singer (1976)
- Marasmius tenuisporus Velen. (1939)
- Marasmius tenuissimus (Jungh.) Singer (1976)
- Marasmius tephromelanus Singer (1989)
- Marasmius teplicensis Antonín & Skála (1993)
- Marasmius tereticeps Singer (1965)
- Marasmius terraefirmae Singer (1989)
- Marasmius testaceiceps Murrill (1946)
- Marasmius testaceus Henn. (1901)
- Marasmius tetrachroinus Singer (1965)
- Marasmius tetrachrous Singer (1976)
- Marasmius theobromae Faber (1909)
- Marasmius thiersii Desjardin (1987) - name changed to Gymnopus thiersii (Desjardin) Mešić & Tkalčec (2013)
- Marasmius thujinus Peck (1903)
- Marasmius tibeticus M.Zang (1979)
- Marasmius tinctorius Massee (1898)
- Marasmius titanosporus D.A.Reid & Jacot Guill. (1988)
- Marasmius todeae Henn. (1898)
- Marasmius togoensis Henn. (1897)
- Marasmius tomentosipes Peck (1902)
- Marasmius torquescens Quél. (1872)
- Marasmius tosensis Henn. (1904)
- Marasmius tremulae Velen. (1947)
- Marasmius trichotus Corner (1996)
- Marasmius trigonobalani Corner (1996)
- Marasmius trinitatis Dennis (1951)
- Marasmius tritici P.A.Young (1925)
- Marasmius trogioides Corner (1996) - name changed to Cyptotrama trogioides (Corner) Zhu L. Yang & J. Qin (2016)
- Marasmius tropicaerotula S.Ito & S.Imai (1939)
- Marasmius truncigenus (Raithelh.) Raithelh. (1985
- Marasmius truncorum Singer (1989)
- Marasmius tshopoensis Antonín (2003)
- Marasmius tubulatus Petch (1948)
- Marasmius tucumanus Singer (1952)
- Marasmius tyrius B.E.Lechner & Papin. (2011) – Argentina

== U ==
- Marasmius ubiquipallens Desjardin & E.Horak (1997)
- Marasmius udoensis I.Hino (1943)
- Marasmius uliginosus Gilliam (1975)
- Marasmius umbilicatus Kauffman (1926)
- Marasmius umbrinus Pegler (1968)
- Marasmius unilamellatus Desjardin & E.Horak (1997)
- Marasmius ushuaiensis (Speg.) Raithelh. (1990)
- Marasmius ustilago Singer (1965)

== V ==
- Marasmius valdivianus Singer (1969)
- Marasmius vagus Guard (2020)
- Marasmius variabiliceps Singer (1965)
- Marasmius variabilis Desjardin & Ovrebo (2006) – Panama
- Marasmius velitaris Corner (1996)
- Marasmius venezuelanus Dennis (1961)
- Marasmius venosus Henn. & E.Nyman (1899)
- Marasmius ventalloi Singer (1947)
- Marasmius ventallonii Singer (1936)
- Marasmius venustus I.Hino (1943)
- Marasmius vergeliensis Singer (1976)
- Marasmius vialis Peck (1898)
- Marasmius viegasii Singer (1957)
- Marasmius vigintifolius Singer (1965)
- Marasmius vinosus Speg. (1909)
- Marasmius violaceoides Antonín (2004)
- Marasmius violaceus Henn. (1897)
- Marasmius violascens Velen. (1947)
- Marasmius violeorotalis Singer (1976)
- Marasmius viridicarneus (Berk. & Broome) Pegler (1986)
- Marasmius viridis Desjardin & E.Horak (1997)
- Marasmius vitreus Velen. (1920)
- Marasmius vladimirii A.K.Dutta & K.Acharya (2014)
- Marasmius volkensii Henn. (1895)

== W ==
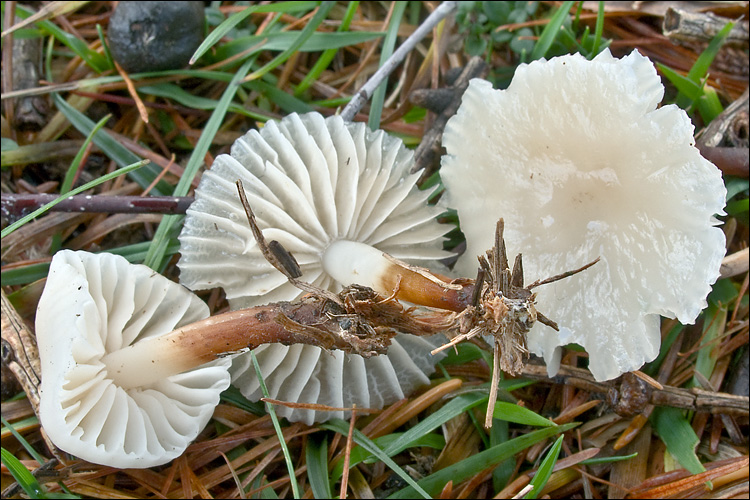
Marasmius wynneae

- Marasmius washingtonensis Penn. (1915)
- Marasmius westii Murrill (1945)
- Marasmius wettsteinii (Kuntze) Sacc. & P.Syd. (1899)
- Marasmius wilsonii Murrill (1915)
- Marasmius wisteriae Antonín, R.Ryoo & H.D.Shin (2014) – Korea
- Marasmius witteanus Singer (1964)
- Marasmius wynneae Berk. & Broome (1859)

== X ==
- Marasmius xenopellis Retn. (2008)
- Marasmius xerampelianus Singer (1976)
- Marasmius xerophyticus Singer (1965)
- Marasmius xestocephaloides Antonín (2004)
- Marasmius xestocephalus Singer (1964)
- Marasmius xylodendron Singer (1989)

== Y ==
- Marasmius yalae Singer (1976)
- Marasmius yangambiensis Singer (1964)
- Marasmius yarizae Singer (1965)

== Z ==
- Marasmius zandbaiensis Henn. & E.Nyman (1899)
- Marasmius zenkeri Henn. (1895)
