= Marasmius midnapurensis =

Scientific classification
- Domain: Eukaryota
- Kingdom: Fungi
- Division: Basidiomycota
- Class: Agaricomycetes
- Order: Agaricales
- Family: Marasmiaceae
- Genus: Marasmius
- Species: M. midnapurensis

Binomial name
- Marasmius midnapurensis A.K.Dutta, P.Pradhan & K.Acharya (2014)

Species of fungus

Marasmius midnapurensis is a species of agaric fungus in the family Marasmiaceae that was first described scientifically in 2014. It is known only from its type locality, in the Midnapur district of West Bengal (India), where it grows on the dried leaves and wood of Acacia. Phylogenetic analysis of the internal transcribed spacer DNA suggests that the fungus is a species distinct from close relatives such as M. jasminodorus and M. aurantioferrugineus, and that it should be classified in Marasmius section Sicci.

== See also ==
- List of Marasmius species
