= Marasmius sasicola =

Scientific classification
- Kingdom: Fungi
- Division: Basidiomycota
- Class: Agaricomycetes
- Order: Agaricales
- Family: Marasmiaceae
- Genus: Marasmius
- Species: M. sasicola

Binomial name
- Marasmius sasicola Har. Takah. (2002)
- Marasmius sasicola is known from the Kanagawa Prefecture, Japan

Species of fungus

Marasmius sasicola Mycological characteristics
- Gills on hymenium
- Cap is convex
- Hymenium is adnexed or adnate
- Stipe is bare
- Ecology is saprotrophic
- Edibility is unknown

Marasmius sasicola is a species of Marasmiaceae fungus known from Kanagawa Prefecture, Japan. First collected in 2000, it was described in 2002 by Haruki Takahashi. The species produces small mushrooms with white caps and very short, very thin black stems. Unlike in other, similar species, the stems enter the plant matter on which the mushroom grows. The six to eight white gills are spread out around the cap, and all of them reach the stem. The flesh has no taste or odour. Found in June, the species grows on dead Sasa leaves, from which it takes its specific epithet.

== Taxonomy and naming ==
Marasmius sasicola was first described by Haruki Takahashi (2002) in an article in Mycoscience, based on specimens collected from Ikuta Ryokuchi Park, Kawasaki, Kanagawa Prefecture, Japan in 2000 and 2001. The specific name sasicola refers to the fact the species grows upon the leaves of Sasa species. The Japanese common name for the species is Sasa-no-houraitake. Within the genus Mycena, it probably belongs to the section Marasmius, and the subsection Penicillati, due to characters of the stem, gills and pileipellis (the outer-most layer of the cap).

== Description ==
Marasmius sasicola produces mushrooms that have convex caps from 5 to 10 millimetres (0.2 to 0.4 in) in diameter featuring folds or striations. The caps do not expand or flatten with age, and are dry and dull. The cap surface is covered in tiny grains which vanish as the mushrooms age. The caps of young mushrooms are coloured light brown, but paler at the cap margin; as they mature, the caps become paler, approaching white when fully matured. The very thin, smooth stem measures between 2 and 3 mm (0.08 and 0.1 in) in length by 0.3 to 0.4 mm (0.01 to 0.02 in) thick. It connects to the centre of the cap, and is a dark brown to black colour. Mycelial cords cannot be seen at the base of the stem, which anchors itself into the substrate. The white gills can be adnexed (attaching to the stem by only part of their depth) to adnate (attaching by their full depth). They are not at all crowded, with between 6 and 8 separate gills, all of which reach the stem. Each gill is up to 2 mm (0.08 in) broad, though it is thinner at the edge. The mushrooms have a very thin layer of whitish flesh up to 0.4 mm (0.02 in) thick. The tough but flexible flesh lacks any odour or taste.

=== Microscopic characteristics ===
Marasmius sasicola produces colourless, ellipsoid basidiospores of between 8 and 10 by 4 to 6 micrometres (μm). The spores have no ornamentation, are not amyloid and have thin cell walls. In his examinations, Takahashi did not observe any basidia, but he did describe the club-shaped basidioles (immature basidia) which measured from 18 to 26 by 6 to 10 μm. The tightly packed cheilocystidia (cystidia on the edge of the gill) form a sterile edge to the gill, and there are no pleurocystidia (cystidia on the face of the gill). The pileipellis, the top layer of the cap, forms a hymeniderm, a cell structure reminiscent of the hymenium on the gills. This is made up of club-shaped cells measuring between 2 and 8 by 7 to 10 μm, with reddish-brown, smooth cell walls up to 1 μm thick. The stipitipellis, the outermost layer of the stem, is made up of cylindrical hyphae measuring from 3 to 6 μm in width, which run parallel to one another. They have featureless brown cell walls measuring up to 1 μm thick, and the septa (the walls separating individual cells) have clamp connections.

The flesh in the cap is made up of irregularly arranged cylindrical hyphae from 5 to 15 μm wide. They stain a dark reddish-brown in Melzer's reagent or Lugol's solution. The flesh in the stem is made up of hyphae which run down the stem and measure 4 to 11 μm in thickness. The smooth cell walls are colorless, but again stain a dark reddish-brown in Melzer's reagent or Lugol's solution. The septa have clamp connections.

=== Similar species ===
Marasmius subconiatus, known from Sri Lanka and Indonesia, is somewhat similar to M. sasicola. It can be differentiated as its stem does not enter the substrate, and the gills differ. In M. subconiatus, the gills are orange, and sport cheilocystidia which are pale yellow.

== Habitat and distribution ==
Marasmius sasicola is known from the lowland forests of Kanagawa Prefecture, Japan, and can be found in June. Mushrooms grow in large numbers close together, and grow from dead leaves of Sasa (grass bamboo) which have fallen.

== See also ==
- List of Marasmius species
