= Marasmius munyozii =

Scientific classification
- Domain: Eukaryota
- Kingdom: Fungi
- Division: Basidiomycota
- Class: Agaricomycetes
- Order: Agaricales
- Family: Marasmiaceae
- Genus: Marasmius
- Species: M. munyozii

Binomial name
- Marasmius munyozii Singer (1969)

Species of fungus

Marasmius munyozii is a species of fungus in the large agaric genus Marasmius. It is found in Chile, where it grows on dead grass leaves. The cap is white, with a pale cinnamon-ochraceous colored center and a slightly grooved margin. The fungus was described as new to science in 1969 by mycologist Rolf Singer.

== See also ==
- List of Marasmius species
