= Marasmius austrorotula =

Scientific classification
- Domain: Eukaryota
- Kingdom: Fungi
- Division: Basidiomycota
- Class: Agaricomycetes
- Order: Agaricales
- Family: Marasmiaceae
- Genus: Marasmius
- Species: M. austrorotula

Binomial name
- Marasmius austrorotula Singer (1969)

Species of fungus

Marasmius austrorotula is a species of fungus in the large agaric genus Marasmius. Found in Argentina, where it grows on the fallen leaves of South American mountain bamboos (Chusquea spp.), it was described as new to science in 1969 by mycologist Rolf Singer.

== See also ==
- List of Marasmius species
