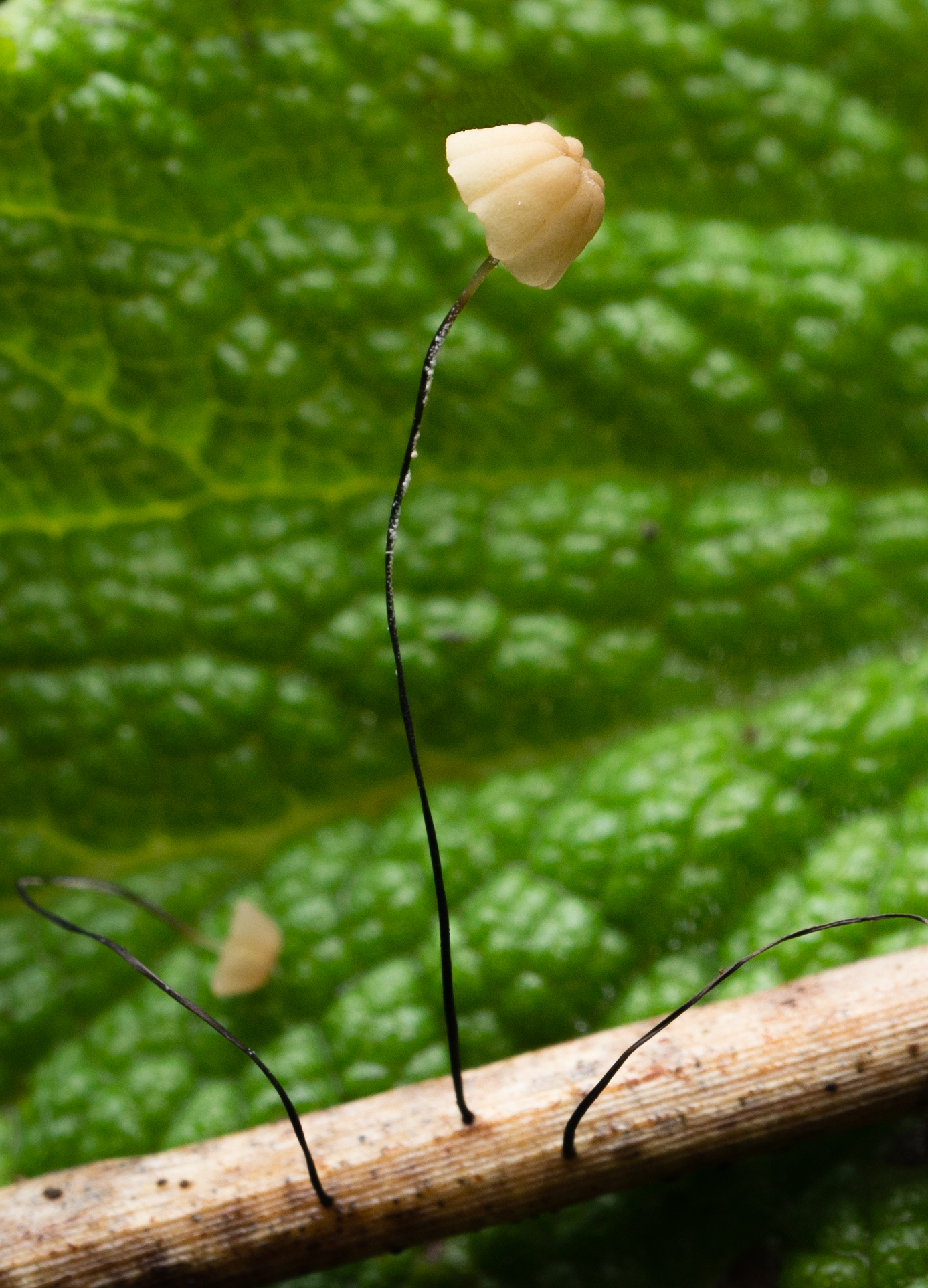
- Marasmius limosus growing on a dead stem of rush (Juncus), found in Portland, Oregon, USA

Scientific classification
- Domain: Eukaryota
- Kingdom: Fungi
- Division: Basidiomycota
- Class: Agaricomycetes
- Order: Agaricales
- Family: Marasmiaceae
- Genus: Marasmius
- Species: M. limosus

Binomial name
- Marasmius limosus Quél. (1878)

= Marasmius limosus =

Species of fungus

Marasmius limosus is a mushroom in the family Marasmiaceae.

== See also ==
- List of Marasmius species
