= Marasmius tenuissimus =

Scientific classification
- Kingdom: Fungi
- Division: Basidiomycota
- Class: Agaricomycetes
- Order: Agaricales
- Family: Marasmiaceae
- Genus: Marasmius
- Species: M. tenuissimus

Binomial name
- Marasmius tenuissimus (Jungh.) Singer (1976)

Synonyms
- Pleurotus tenuissimus Jungh. (1838); Dendrosarcus tenuissimus (Jungh.) Kuntze (1898)

Species of fungus

Marasmius tenuissimus is a species of fungus in the family Marasmiaceae. It is known from Indonesia, including Java and Western New Guinea, where it has been associated with blight disease on living plants. The species can grow on both cultivated plants such as cacao and coffee and on wild vegetation.

The fungus produces delicate fruiting bodies with caps typically less than 3 centimetres (1.2 in) across. Young caps are pale orange, becoming more greyish-orange or brownish with age. The cap surface is thin and somewhat irregular in shape, ranging from convex to nearly flat at maturity. Its gills are unusually distant from one another and often interconnected by cross-veins, giving the underside a net-like appearance. M. tenuissimus belongs to section Neosessiles, a group of closely related species with reduced or absent stems.

Microscopically, the species is characterized by specialized hair-like and broom-shaped cells on the gill edges and cap surfaces.

== See also ==
- List of Marasmius species
