= Marasmius sacchari =

Scientific classification
- Kingdom: Fungi
- Division: Basidiomycota
- Class: Agaricomycetes
- Order: Agaricales
- Family: Marasmiaceae
- Genus: Marasmius
- Species: M. sacchari

Binomial name
- Marasmius sacchari Wakker (1896)

Synonyms
- Collybia sacchari (Wakker) Singer (1962); Marasmiellus sacchari Singer (1952)

Species of fungus

Marasmius sacchari is a fungal plant pathogen which has been identified as causing root rot of sugar cane.

== See also ==
- List of Marasmius species
