= Marasmius pacificus =

Scientific classification
- Kingdom: Fungi
- Division: Basidiomycota
- Class: Agaricomycetes
- Order: Agaricales
- Family: Marasmiaceae
- Genus: Marasmius
- Species: M. pacificus

Binomial name
- Marasmius pacificus Singer (1969)

Species of fungus

Marasmius pacificus is a species of fungus in the large agaric genus Marasmius. It is found in Chile, where it grows on the fallen leaves of Aextoxicon, Laurelia, and Myrtaceae. The fungus was described as new to science in 1969 by mycologist Rolf Singer.

== See also ==
- List of Marasmius species
