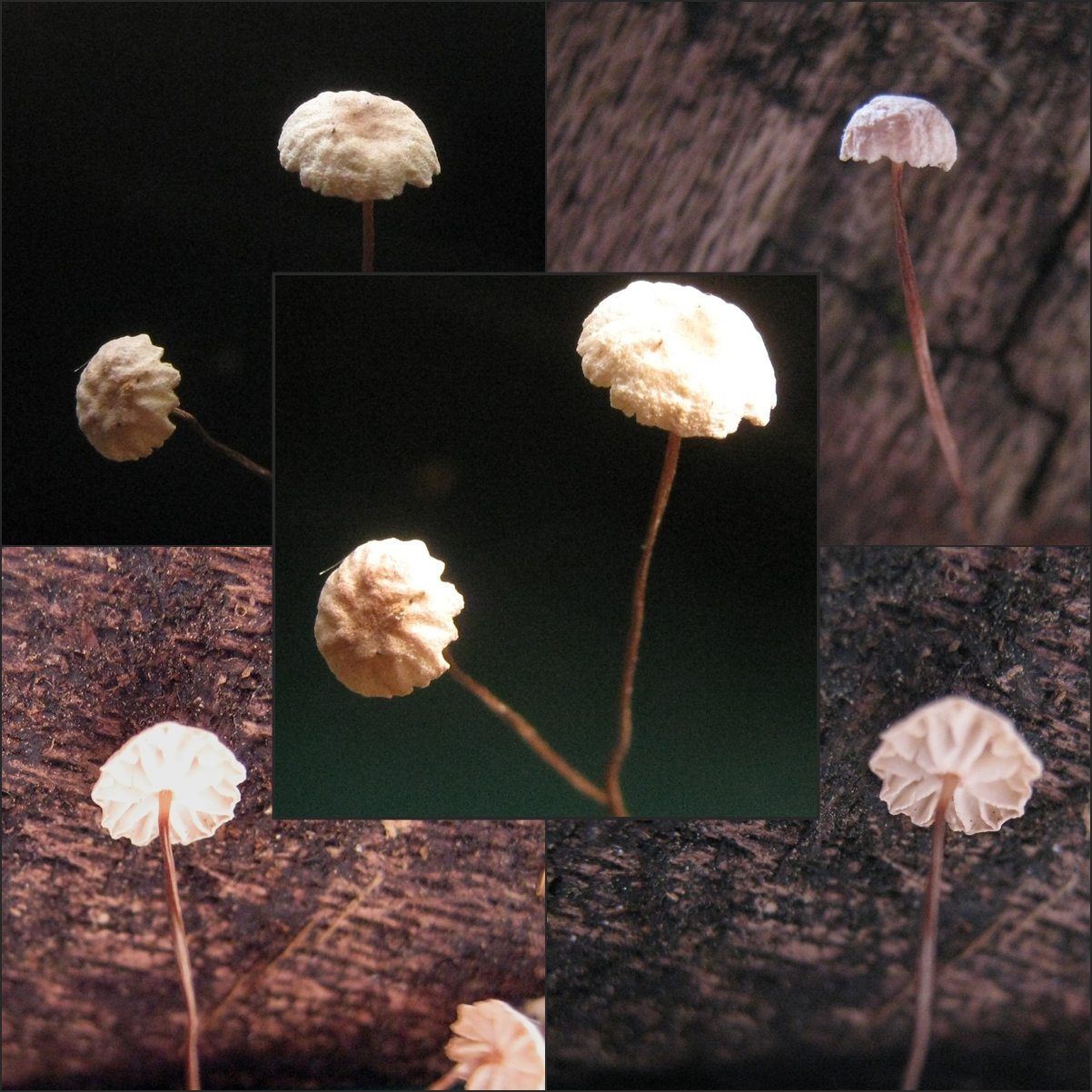

Scientific classification
- Domain: Eukaryota
- Kingdom: Fungi
- Division: Basidiomycota
- Class: Agaricomycetes
- Order: Agaricales
- Family: Marasmiaceae
- Genus: Marasmius
- Species: M. bulliardii

Binomial name
- Marasmius bulliardii Quél. (1878)

Synonyms
- Androsaceus bulliardii (Quél.) Pat. (1887); Chamaeceras bulliardii (Quél.) Kuntze (1898)

= Marasmius bulliardii =

Species of fungus

Marasmius bulliardii is a species of agaric fungus in the family Marasmiaceae. It was first described scientifically by French mycologist Lucien Quélet in 1878.

== See also ==
- List of Marasmius species
