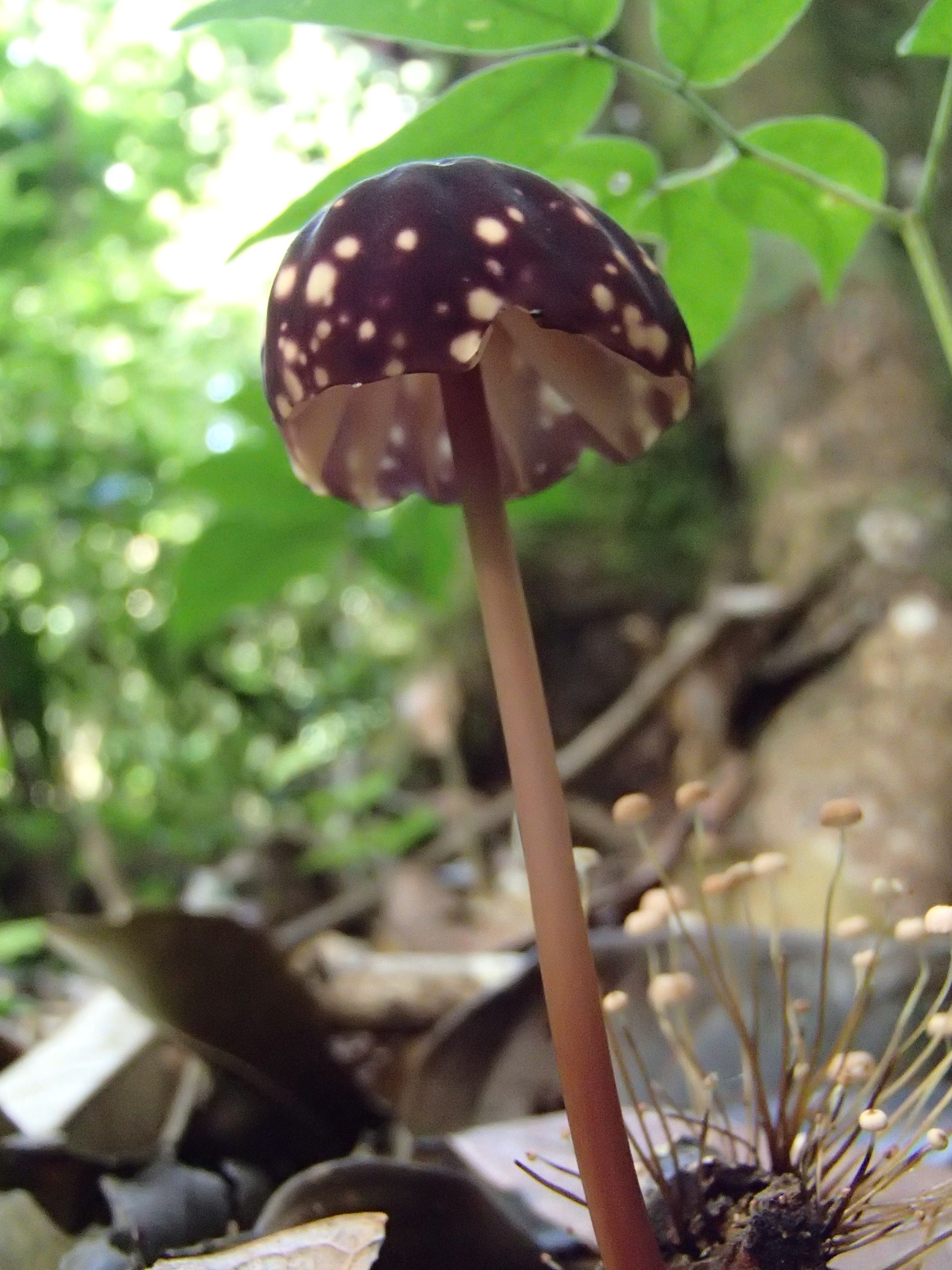

Scientific classification
- Domain: Eukaryota
- Kingdom: Fungi
- Division: Basidiomycota
- Class: Agaricomycetes
- Order: Agaricales
- Family: Marasmiaceae
- Genus: Marasmius
- Species: M. amazonicus

Binomial name
- Marasmius amazonicus Henn. (1904)

= Marasmius amazonicus =

Species of fungus

Marasmius amazonicus is a species of agaric fungus in the family Marasmiaceae. Described as new to science in 1904 by mycologist Paul Christoph Hennings, it is found in South America.

== See also ==
- List of Marasmius species
