= Marasmius asiaticus =

Scientific classification
- Kingdom: Fungi
- Division: Basidiomycota
- Class: Agaricomycetes
- Order: Agaricales
- Family: Marasmiaceae
- Genus: Marasmius
- Species: M. asiaticus

Binomial name
- Marasmius asiaticus Mešić & Tkalčec (2010)

Synonyms
- Marasmius distantifolius Y.S.Tan & Desjardin (2009)

Species of fungus

Marasmius asiaticus is a species of agaric fungus in the family Marasmiaceae. Within the large genus Marasmius, it is classified in section Sicci. Known only from a single collection made in Mount Nuang Forest Reserve (Peninsular Malaysia), it was described as new to science in 2009 by Tan and Dennis Desjardin under the name Marasmius distantifolius. This was later discovered to be an illegitimate homonym of a species named by William Alphonso Murrill in 1915, now known as Marasmiellus distantifolius. Armin Mešić and Zdenko Tkalčec proposed the new epithet asiaticus, referring to its distribution. The original epithet, which combined the Latin distans ("distant") and -folius ("leaf"), alluded to the distantly-spaced gills.

== See also ==
- List of Marasmius species
