= Marasmius lomatiae =

Scientific classification
- Domain: Eukaryota
- Kingdom: Fungi
- Division: Basidiomycota
- Class: Agaricomycetes
- Order: Agaricales
- Family: Marasmiaceae
- Genus: Marasmius
- Species: M. lomatiae

Binomial name
- Marasmius lomatiae Singer (1969)

Species of fungus

Marasmius lomatiae is a species of fungus in the large agaric genus Marasmius. It is found in Argentina, where it grows on the dead leaves of Lomatia, Luma and Nothofagus species. The fungus was described as new to science in 1969 by mycologist Rolf Singer.

== See also ==
- List of Marasmius species
