= Marasmius valdivianus =

Scientific classification
- Domain: Eukaryota
- Kingdom: Fungi
- Division: Basidiomycota
- Class: Agaricomycetes
- Order: Agaricales
- Family: Marasmiaceae
- Genus: Marasmius
- Species: M. valdivianus

Binomial name
- Marasmius valdivianus Singer (1969)

Species of fungus

Marasmius valdivianus is a species of fungus in the large agaric genus Marasmius. Found in Chile, the fungus was described as new to science in 1969 by mycologist Rolf Singer.

== See also ==
- List of Marasmius species
