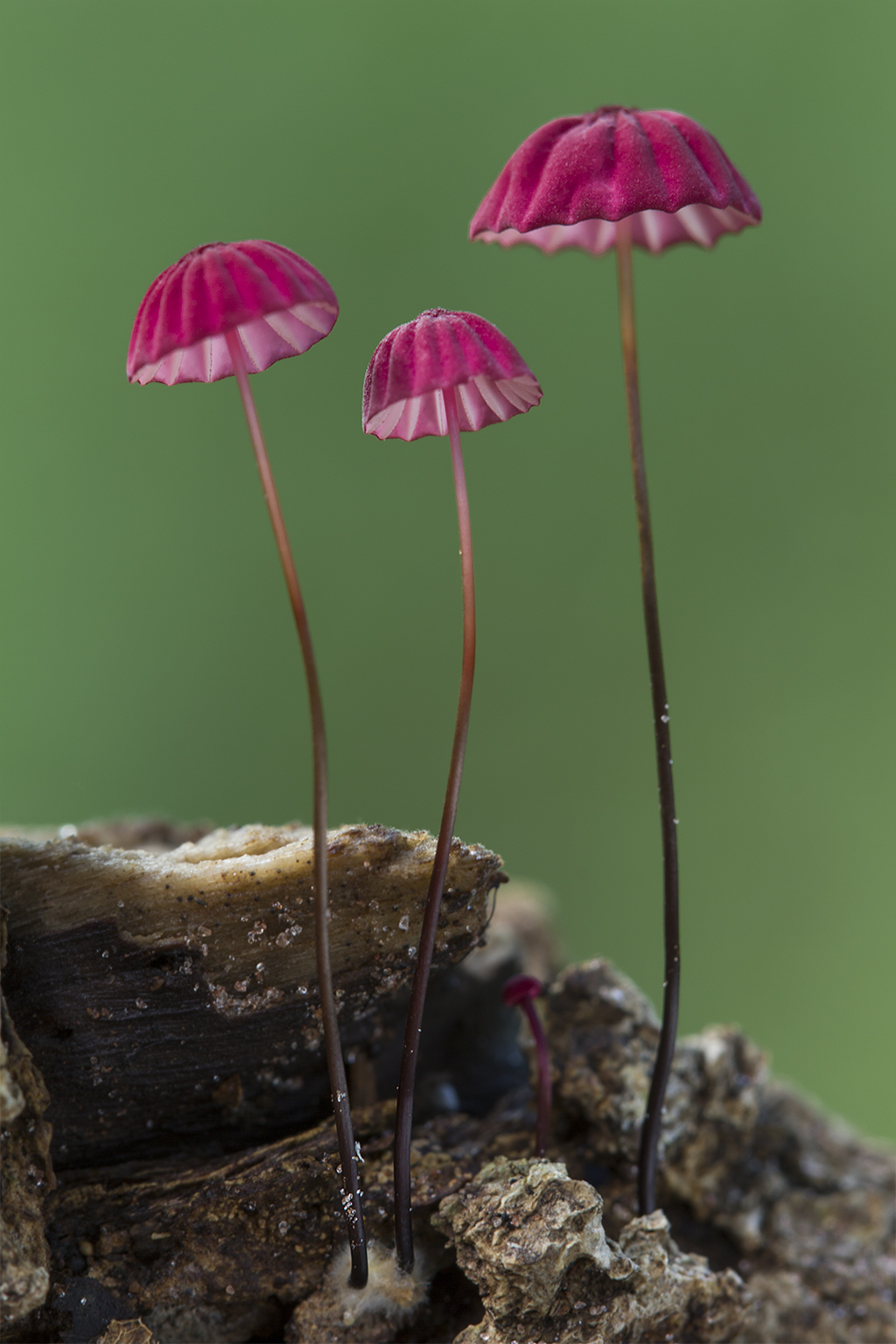

Scientific classification
- Kingdom: Fungi
- Division: Basidiomycota
- Class: Agaricomycetes
- Order: Agaricales
- Family: Marasmiaceae
- Genus: Marasmius
- Species: M. haematocephalus

Binomial name
- Marasmius haematocephalus (Mont.) Fr.

Synonyms
- Agaricus haematocephalus Mont.

= Marasmius haematocephalus =

Species of mushroom

Marasmius haematocephalus, commonly known as the purple pinwheel, is a basidiomycete mushroom of the genus Marasmius. It grows on leaf litter and forms basidiocarps with striated purple caps. Historically believed to have a large pantropical distribution, it is now believed to be a species complex.

== Taxonomy ==
Marasmius haematocephalus was first described from fallen leaves in Brazil as Agaricus haematocephalus by Jean Pierre François Camille Montagne in 1837. The species was then transferred to Marasmius by Elias Magnus Fries in 1838. Future collectors identified morphologically similar specimens from around the world as M. haematocephalus, but molecular data showed that these various collections represented a species complex. Currently, the "true" M. haematocephalus is believed to be limited to South America. Many new species from this complex have been recently described from Brazil and Australia. New species from Brazil include Marasmius auranticapitatus, Marasmius castanocephalus, Marasmius coasiaticus, Marasmius roseus, and Marasmius rubicundus which was formerly described as Marasmius haematocephalus var. rubicundus. New Australian species include Marasmius campaniformis, Marasmius pervagatus, Marasmius porphyrocephalus, Marasmius purpureospadiceus, Marasmius vinaceus, Marasmius wianwian, and Marasmius wunga. These species were differentiated using a combination of molecular phylogenies and differences in cell morphologies. Molecular evidence suggests that there are still other cryptic species within this complex than remain to be described.

== Morphology ==
Marasmius haematocephalus has a dark purple to blood red cap of a diameter of 2.5–16 mm (0.098–0.630 in) which is very thin and contains deep striations above its gills, giving it its "pinwheel" appearance. Other members of the species complex may have similarly colored caps, or caps that are brown or pink. Its gills are free to narrowly adnate, distantly spaced from each other, and white to cream in color. It has a very thin stipe and hard stipe, characteristic of many Marasmius species. The stipe is mostly black, turning the same color as the gills towards the apex. The height of the stipe is 22.4–62 mm (0.88–2.44 in).

== Distribution ==
Historically thought to have a pantropical distribution, M. haematocephalus is now believed to only occur in South America with the type specimen being collected in Brazil. Members of the species complex have been collected in southeastern US states, China, India, and South Africa.

== Chemical properties ==
Compounds extracted from M. haematocephalus were found to have strong antioxidant capabilities as well as perform as strong inhibitors of the acetylcholinesterase enzyme. Other inhibitors of this enzyme are used for various medical treatments. Extracts from M. haematocephalus were also found to inhibit gram positive bacterial growth.

== Mating ==
Marasmius haematocephalus was found to have a bipolar mating system, meaning that mating type is determined by a single gene.
