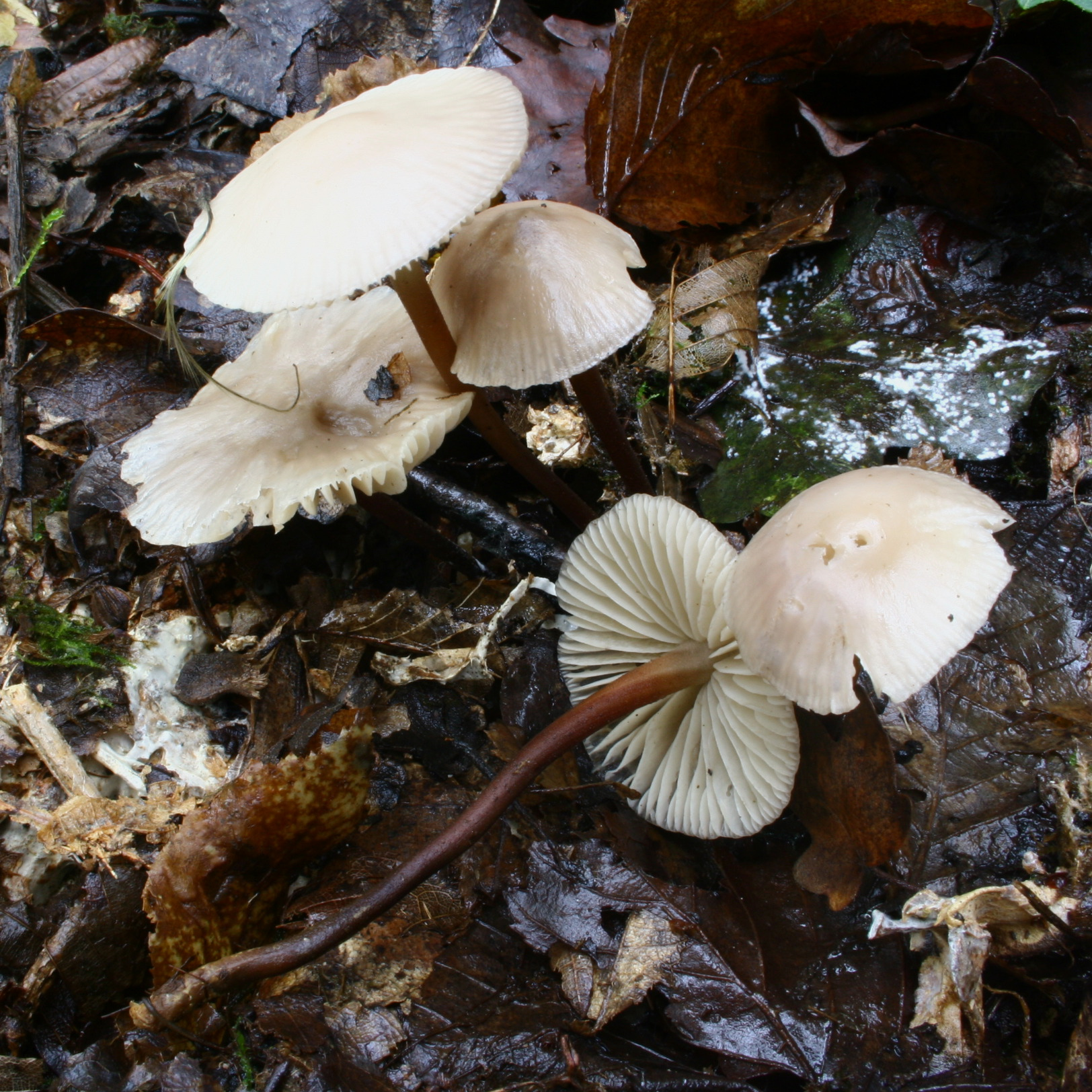

Scientific classification
- Kingdom: Fungi
- Division: Basidiomycota
- Class: Agaricomycetes
- Order: Agaricales
- Family: Marasmiaceae
- Genus: Marasmius
- Species: M. wynneae

Binomial name
- Marasmius wynneae Berk. & Broome (1859)

= Marasmius wynneae =

Species of gilled mushroom

Marasmius wynneae
- Mycological characteristics
- Gills on hymenium
- Cap is convex or conical
- Hymenium is adnexed
- Stipe is bare
- Spore print is white
- Ecology is saprotrophic
- Edibility is inedible

Marasmius wynneae (sometimes incorrectly spelt Marasmius wynnei) is a species of gilled mushroom found in European woods.

== Naming ==
This species was originally described in 1859 by the mycologists Miles Joseph Berkeley and Christopher Edmund Broome in the British "Annals and Magazine of Natural History". The original collection was done on the Coed Coch estate in Denbighshire, Wales, which then belonged to the Wynne family. The entry for the new species explicitly mentions Mrs. Wynne, and so it is clear that the mushroom was named for Mary Lloyd Wynne and not her husband. A Latinized species name takes the genitive ending -i (or -ii) if it is dedicated to a man and it takes -ae (or -iae) if it is for a woman. Therefore, the spelling wynneae is correct here, even though the spelling in the original description of the species was wynnei.

In English this fungus has the common name "Pearly Parachute".

== Description ==
The same set of references applies to this section throughout.

The hygrophanous cap is hemispherical and white to greyish or ochre when young. Later it expands to become flat and may turn grey or also take on violet tints. The diameter is from about 1 cm to 5 cm.

The whitish thick and distant gills are almost free to emarginate. There is no ring or other veil remnant.

The tough stem is up to about 7 cm long and up to 0.5 cm in diameter. Initially it is whitish and it becomes red brown from the base.

The taste is mild and the smell is pleasant initially (of hay, melilot or bitter almonds) but after a moment it becomes unpleasant (of acid, or a drying facecloth).

The spore powder is white and the spores are ellipsoid, sometimes elongated (with an aspect ratio up to about 2) and are around 6-8 μm by 3.5-4.5 μm. There are cheilocystidia which are club-shaped to spindle-shaped with lobes at one end.

== Distribution, habitat, ecology and human impact ==
This saprobic mushroom grows in clusters on humus and litter in beech woods or other broad-leaved woods. The conspicuous white mycelium can bind leaf litter together in sheets.

This mushroom is widespread from August to January in Europe, and has been reported from Algeria, Morocco, and Texas, but not from other regions. It is common in western temperate Europe, especially under beech.

== Links ==
- Media related to Marasmius wynneae at Wikimedia Commons
- Marasmius wynneae in Index Fungorum.
- "Marasmius wynneae". National Center for Biotechnology Information (NCBI).
