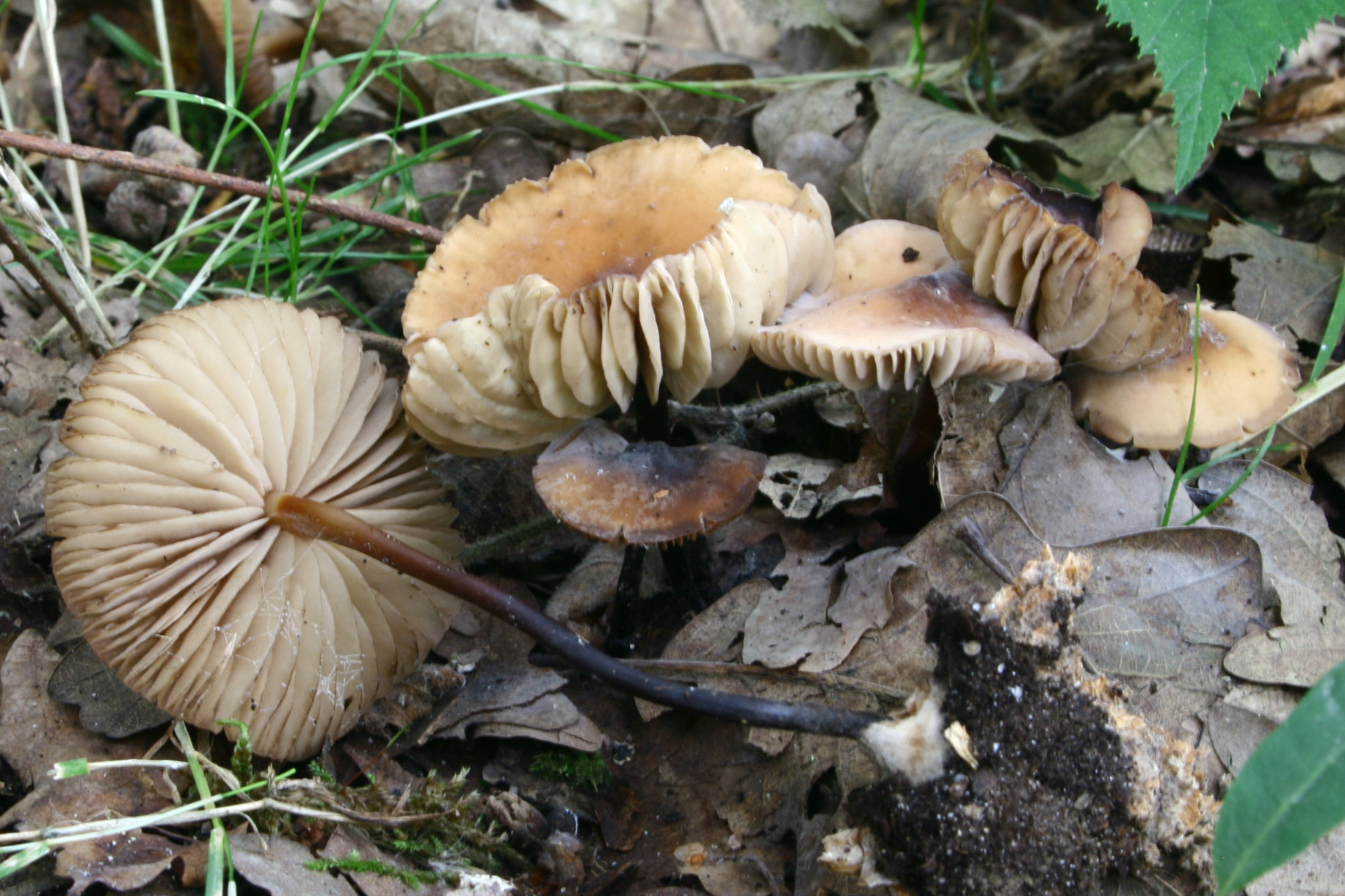

Scientific classification
- Kingdom: Fungi
- Division: Basidiomycota
- Class: Agaricomycetes
- Order: Agaricales
- Family: Marasmiaceae
- Genus: Marasmius
- Species: M. cohaerens

Binomial name
- Marasmius cohaerens (Pers.) Cooke & Quél. (1878)

= Marasmius cohaerens =

Species of gilled mushroom

Marasmius cohaerens Mycological characteristics
- Gills on hymenium
- Cap is convex or campanulate
- Hymenium is adnexed
- Stipe is bare
- Spore print is white
- Ecology is saprotrophic
- Edibility is inedible

Marasmius cohaerens is a species of gilled mushroom which is fairly common in European woods.

== Description ==
This section uses the given references throughout.

The matt or slightly felted cap grows from about 1 cm to 3.5 cm, and can be pale brown, yellow brown or chocolate brown, sometimes also with a pink tinge. The shape develops with age from campanulate to flat.

There is no ring or other veil remnant. The stem is about 5 to 9 cm long and up to 0.5 cm in diameter and varies from dark brown at the base to whitish at the top with some ochraceous to reddish colour in the middle. It has a distinctive shiny and horny consistency.

The adnate to almost free gills are quite distant and have a cream to brownish colour with a darker brown edge and there are tiny hairs on the edge which can be seen with a hand-lens. The taste is mild and there is little smell.

The spores are ellipsoid to almond-shaped and are around 8-10.5 μm by 4–5.5 μm. There are cheilocystidia which take a broadly club-shaped form with finger-like protrusions at the far end; such cells are known as "broom cells of the siccus type" (see Marasmius siccus).

== Distribution, habitat, ecology and human impact ==
This saprobic mushroom grows singly or in small groups on humus and litter in beech forests or with other deciduous trees and (only occasionally) in coniferous forests.

It is widely distributed and fairly common in Europe, and in eastern Asia. It also occurs though rarely in North America, and there other varieties have been identified (the European one being M. cohaerens var. cohaerens).

== Naming ==
This species was originally described by the mycologist Christiaan Hendrik Persoon in 1801 as Agaricus cohaerens. Then in 1878 in a common work published in London, Mordecai Cubitt Cooke and Lucien Quélet assigned the current name which has remained the same for over 100 years.

The Latin epithet cohaerens has the same origin as the English word "coherent" and means "keeping together" (i.e. it is difficult to pull the mushroom apart).

== Links ==
- Media related to Marasmius cohaerens at Wikimedia Commons
- Marasmius cohaerens in Index Fungorum
- " cohaerens". National Center for Biotechnology Information (NCBI).
