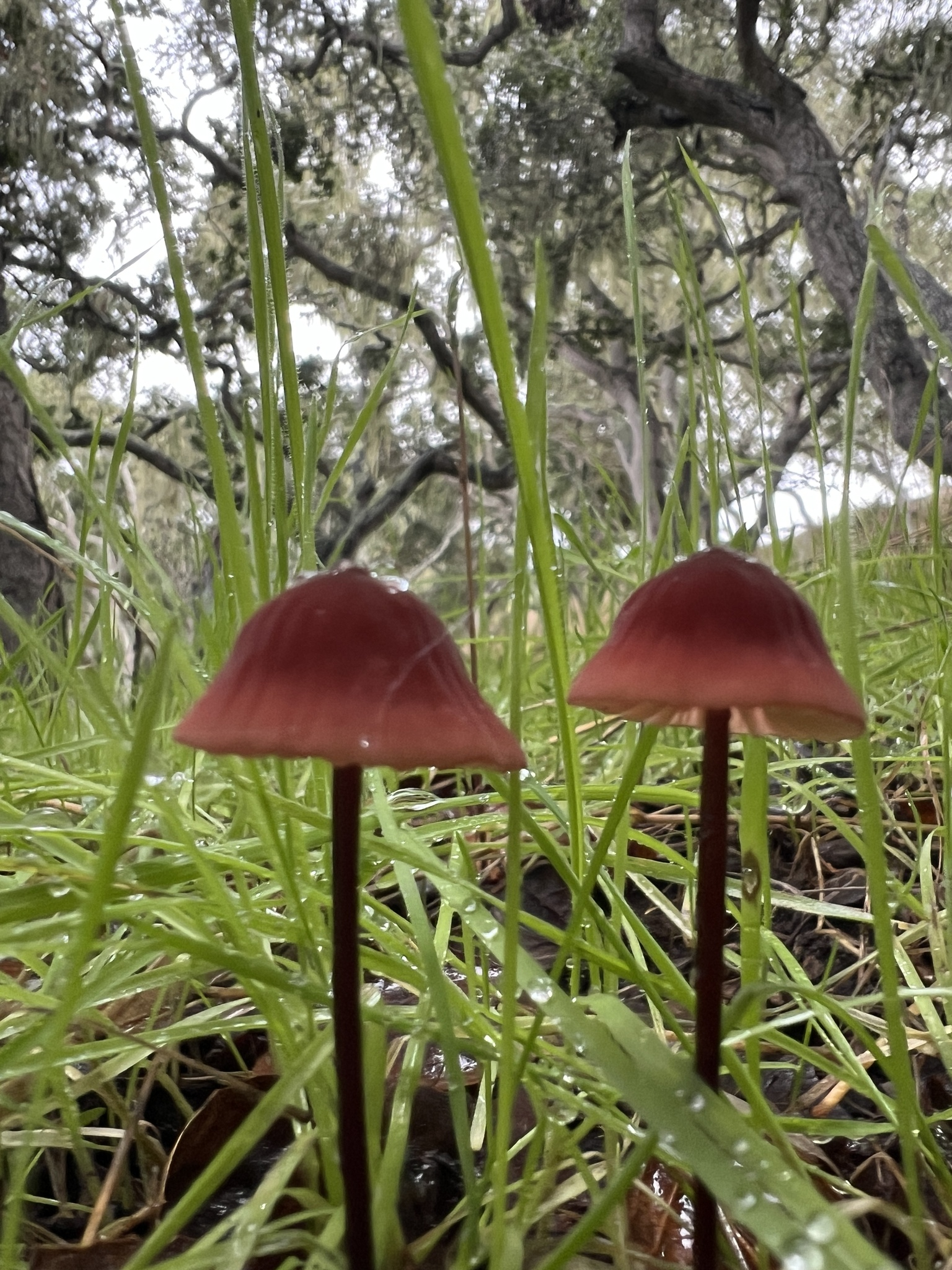
- Monterey County, California

Scientific classification
- Kingdom: Fungi
- Division: Basidiomycota
- Class: Agaricomycetes
- Order: Agaricales
- Family: Marasmiaceae
- Genus: Marasmius
- Species: M. plicatulus

Binomial name
- Marasmius plicatulus Peck, 1897

= Marasmius plicatulus =

Fungus species

Marasmius plicatulus, also known as the red pinwheel or pleated marasmius, is a North American species of fungus.

== Description ==
The cap is mahogany with a velvety texture and up to 4 centimetres (1 1/2 in) wide. The gills are adnate, widely spaced, and pallid to pinkish. The stipe is dark, smooth, up to 13 cm (5 in) long and 3 mm (1/8 in) thick. The spore print is white. It is too tough and thin for consideration as edible.

It is the largest Marasmius species found on the North American West Coast. Some members of the genus from further east are vaguely similar.

== Habitat and distribution ==
The red pinwheel is often found in association with oak trees or conifers. From November to February, it is common on the Pacific coast, but it has been observed as far inland as Idaho.
