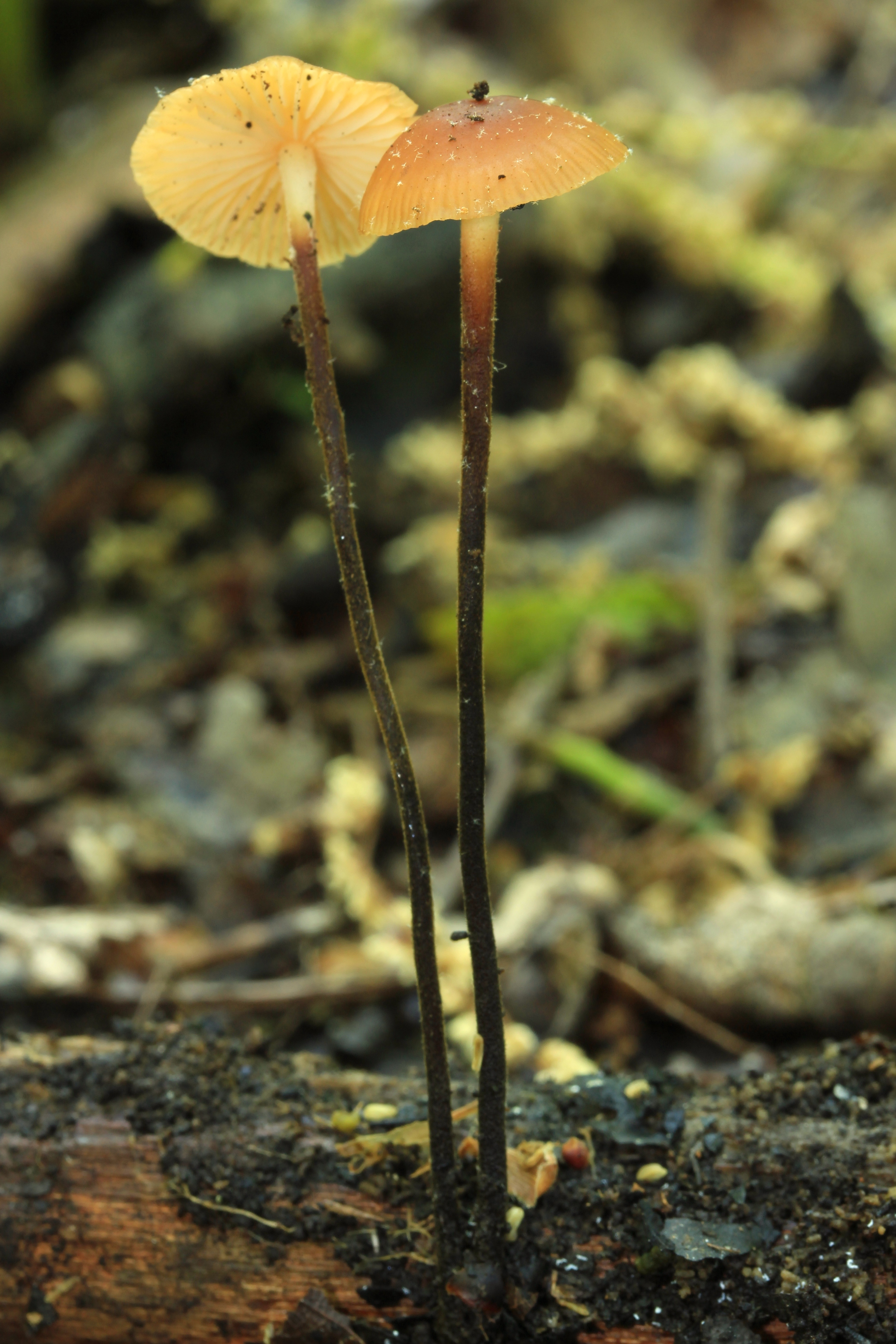

Scientific classification
- Kingdom: Fungi
- Division: Basidiomycota
- Class: Agaricomycetes
- Order: Agaricales
- Family: Physalacriaceae
- Genus: Rhizomarasmius
- Species: R. pyrrhocephalus

Binomial name
- Rhizomarasmius pyrrhocephalus (Berk.) R.H.Petersen (2000)

= Rhizomarasmius pyrrhocephalus =

Species of fungus

Rhizomarasmius pyrrhocephalus is a taxon of fungus. It serves as the type species of its genus.

== Taxonomy ==
The genus Rhizomarasmius was split from Marasmius due to morphological differences such as the cystidia and the rooting stipe (hence the prefix rhizo). Rhizomarasmius pyrrhocephalus is the type species.

== Description ==
The orange-colored cap is 1–2.5 centimetres (1/2–1 in) wide. Its rooted black stipe has velvety hairs and is up to 9 cm (3 1/2 in) long. It has adnate gills and a white spore print, not unlike Marasmius species.

=== Similar species ===
It can resemble Marasmius sullivantii, Marasmiellus biformis and M. subnudus.

== Distribution and habitat ==
This mushroom is known mainly from eastern North America, and grows from May to October on leaf litter and wood.
