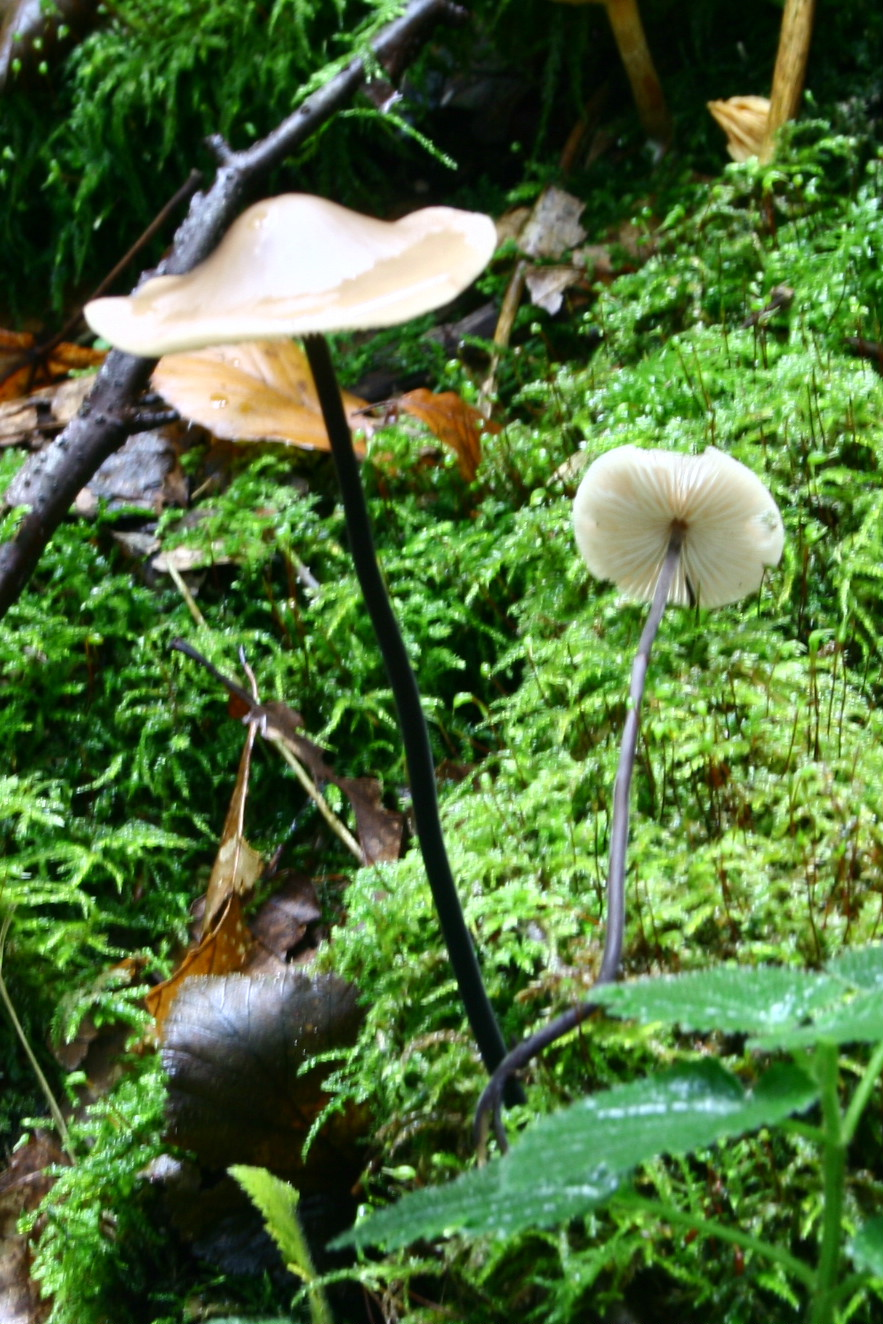
- M. alliaceus

Scientific classification
- Kingdom: Fungi
- Division: Basidiomycota
- Class: Agaricomycetes
- Order: Agaricales
- Family: Omphalotaceae
- Genus: Mycetinis
- Species: M. alliaceus

Binomial name
- Mycetinis alliaceus (Jacq.) Earle ex A.W. Wilson & Desjardin (2005)

Synonyms
- Marasmius alliaceus (Jacq.) Fr. (1838)

= Mycetinis alliaceus =

Species of fungus

Mycetinis alliaceus
- Mycological characteristics
- Gills on hymenium
- Cap is convex
- Hymenium is adnate
- Stipe is bare
- Spore print is white
- Ecology is saprotrophic
- Edibility is edible

Mycetinis alliaceus (syn. Marasmius alliaceus), commonly known as the garlic parachute, is one of the larger mushrooms formerly in the genus Marasmius, having a beige cap of up to 4 cm and a long tough slender stipe. It emanates a strong smell of garlic, and this is the significance of the Latin species name, alliaceus. It is distributed throughout Europe, being fairly common in some areas and quite rare in others.

== Description ==
The species can be described as follows:

- The cap is beige, ochre or flesh-coloured and is 2–4 cm in diameter, sometimes wrinkled, somewhat domed in the middle.
- The gills are whitish and narrowly attached to the stem.
- The spore powder is white.
- The tough dark-coloured stem can be 15 cm tall but is only up to 3 mm in diameter.
- The stem is velvety (pruinose) and black below, though it may be brown near the top.

The strong taste and smell of garlic is a product of the separation of γ-glutamyl-marismin. This mushroom is found in European woods (especially beech woods) from early summer to autumn, growing on fallen leaves and rotting wood.

== Related species and naming ==
This species was originally documented by Nikolaus Joseph Freiherr von Jacquin in 1773 and subsequently it was long known as Marasmius alliaceus, a designation established by Elias Magnus Fries. It gave its name to the section Alliacei of genus Marasmius until following a 2005 paper it was decided to separate this group off into genus Mycetinis (see that page for more details). The most likely species to be confused is the fairly common Mycetinis scorodonius, which is distinguished by a bare shiny red-brown stem. Mycetinis querceus (once wrongly identified with: M. prasiosmus) has a velvety stem like M. alliaceus, but the colour is purple-brown.

Related garlic-smelling species also occur in America; examples are Marasmius perlongispermus and Mycetinis copelandii.

== Edibility ==
The cap of M. alliaceus is edible, but of limited culinary value due to its meagre flesh. It can be added to dishes to give a garlic flavour, which could be useful for people who are allergic to real garlic.
