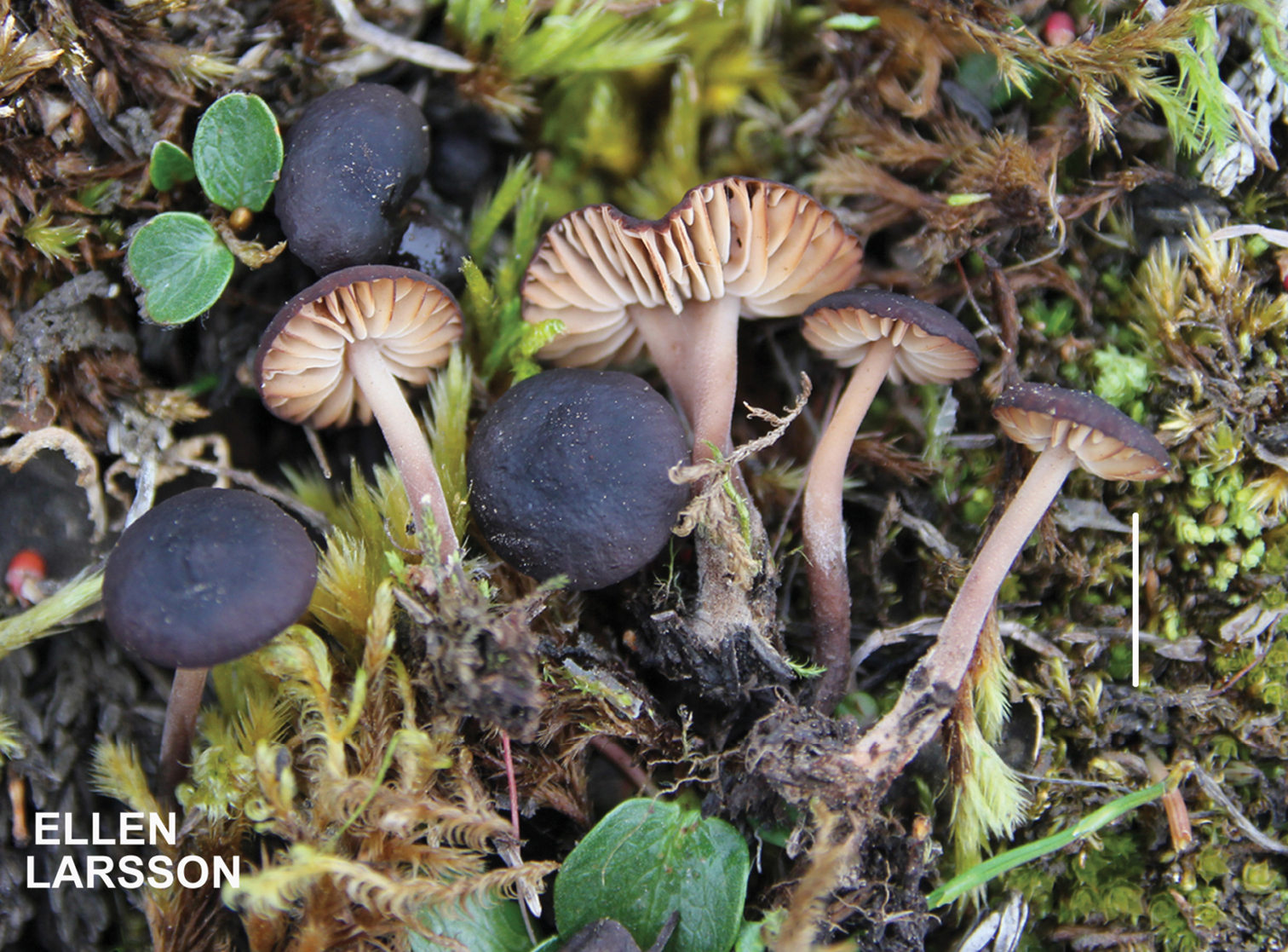

Scientific classification
- Kingdom: Fungi
- Division: Basidiomycota
- Class: Agaricomycetes
- Order: Agaricales
- Family: Omphalotaceae
- Genus: Mycetinis
- Species: M. kallioneus

Binomial name
- Mycetinis kallioneus (Huhtinen) Antonín & Noordel. (2008)

Synonyms
- Marasmius kallioneus Huhtinen (1985)

= Mycetinis kallioneus =

Species of fungus

Mycetinis kallioneus
- Mycological characteristics
- Gills on hymenium
- Cap is convex
- Hymenium is adnate
- Stipe is bare
- Spore print is white
- Edibility is unknown

Mycetinis kallioneus (syn. Marasmius kallioneus) is a mushroom formerly in the genus Marasmius, which grows with dwarf shrubs and flowering plants in an arctic environment where the ground is covered by snow for much of the year.

== Description ==
The species can be described as follows:

- The cap is dark brown when moist and is hygrophanous. It measures up to around 2 cm in diameter.
- The gills are white, thick and distant. The spore powder is white.
- The pruinose (powdery) stem can grow to about 4 cm tall and up to 2 mm in diameter.
- The smell is strongly of onions or garlic (without any foetid element).
- The spores are roughly ellipsoid or almond-shaped and measure about 10-12 μm x 7-8 μm. There are occasional cheilocystidia and pleurocystidia which may be narrowly bottle-shaped or cylindrical, about 30-40 μm × 3-10 μm. The basidia are 2-spored (or occasionally with only a single spore).

== Naming and related species ==
This species was originally defined as Marasmius kallioneus by S. Huhtinen in 1985 and was then transferred to the new genus Mycetinis in 2005 (see the Mycetinis page for more details).

The smell and the arctic habitat are enough to distinguish it from other European species of Mycetinis.

== Ecology and distribution ==
This mushroom lives in an arctic snow bed habitat, growing with cold-adapted shrubs such as dwarf willow and dwarf birch and with herbaceous plants. It has only been found in Greenland and Svalbard, generally from August to September.
