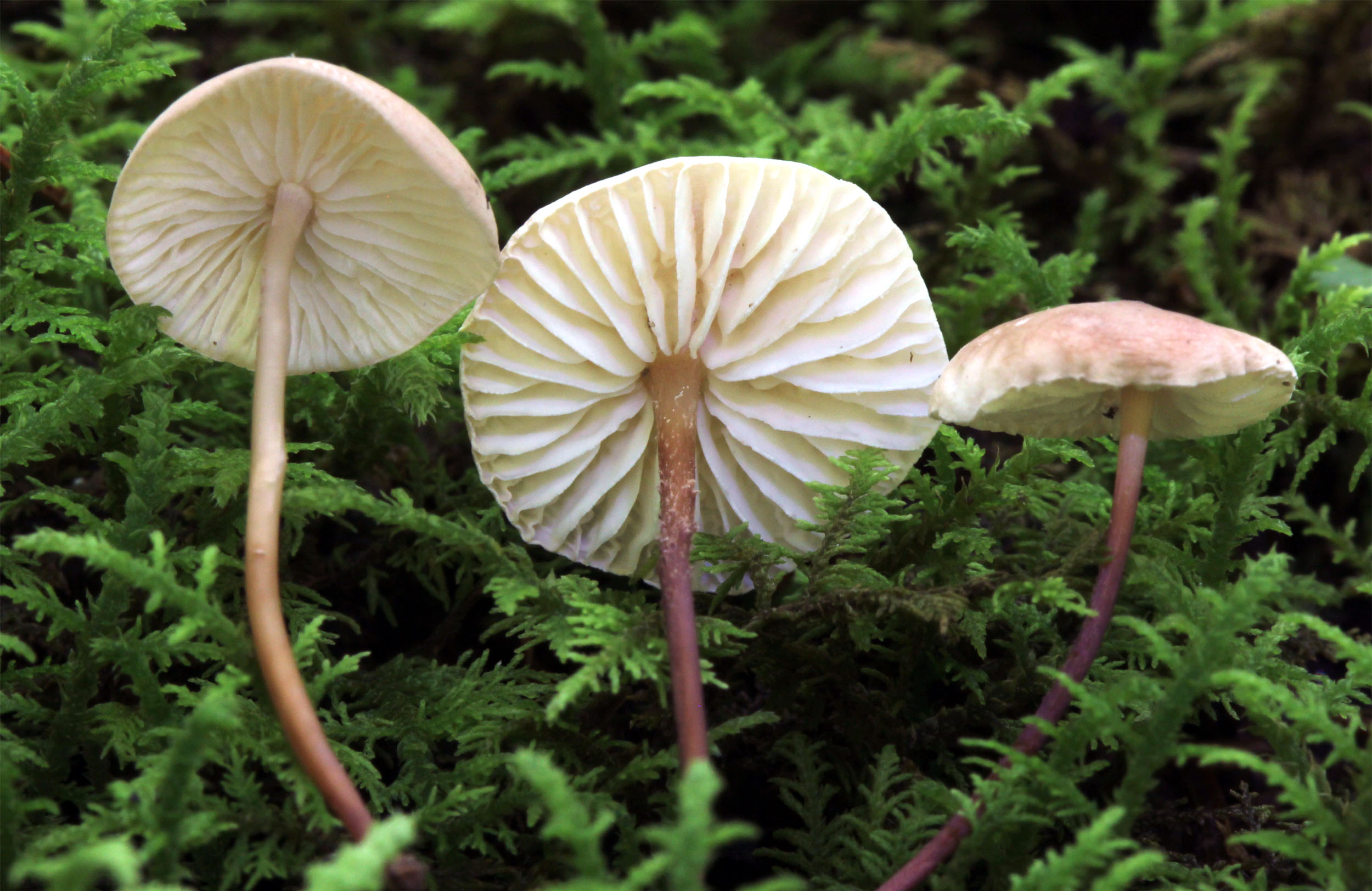
- Mycetinis scorodonius

Scientific classification
- Domain: Eukaryota
- Kingdom: Fungi
- Division: Basidiomycota
- Class: Agaricomycetes
- Order: Agaricales
- Family: Omphalotaceae
- Genus: Mycetinis; Earle (1909)

Type species
- Mycetinis alliaceus (Jacq.) Earle (1909)

Species
- M. alliaceus M. applanatipes M. copelandii M. curraniae M. kallioneus M. opacus M. querceus M. salalis M. scorodonius

= Mycetinis =

Genus of fungi

Mycetinis is a genus of fungus in the Omphalotaceae family, containing about eight species formerly classified in Marasmius.

== General ==
This group of mushrooms was long known as a section (Alliacei) within the more familiar genus Marasmius, which means that each of the species has a synonym under Marasmius. They are distinguished from other Marasmius by the hymeniform cap skin which consists of smooth cells, with hyphae which do not show a dextrinoid reaction. The species have a characteristic garlic smell.

DNA studies showed that the group is phylogenetically allied more to genus Gymnopus than to Marasmius, but the distinct structure of the cap skin is thought to justify a separation at the genus level. Franklin Sumner Earle had already defined the genus name Mycetinis for this group in 1909, though it had not caught on, and in 2005 Wilson & Desjardin proposed to resurrect this name and redefine it for the current taxonomy. The new phylogenetic classification also means that the group belongs to family Omphalotaceae instead of Marasmiaceae.

A new species, M. curraniae, was described in 2012.

== Species ==
Image	Name	Notes	Distribution
	Mycetinis alliaceus	Type species	Europe
	Mycetinis applanatipes		California
	Mycetinis cinnamomeus		S. Australia
	Mycetinis copelandii		California
	Mycetinis curraniae		New Zealand
	(Mycetinis epidryas)	Synonym of Rhizomarasmius epidryas	Arctic (Europe, Canada & Alaska) or alpine
	Mycetinis kallioneus		Arctic (Greenland & Svarlbard)
	Mycetinis olidus		N. America
	Mycetinis opacus		N. America, Japan
	Mycetinis prasiosmus		Scandinavia and continental Europe
	Mycetinis querceus		Europe, N. Africa
	Mycetinis salalis		N. America
	Mycetinis scorodonius	Also has a smaller form "forma diminutivus" found only in Washington state urban environments	Mainly Europe, also N. Africa, N. America, Israel
	Mycetinis virgultorum		Mediterranean
	Mycetinis yunnanensis		Yunnan, China
