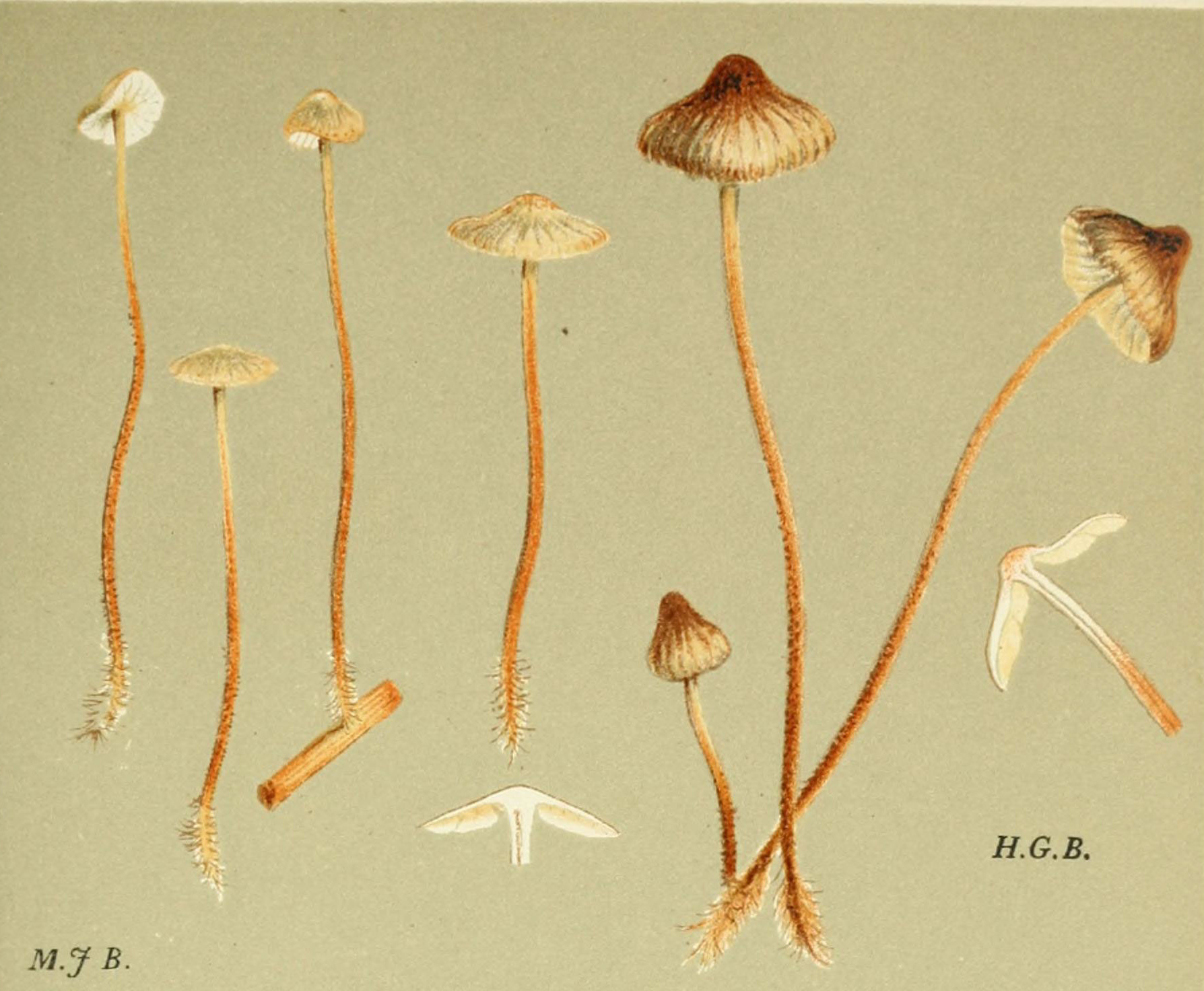

Scientific classification
- Kingdom: Fungi
- Division: Basidiomycota
- Class: Agaricomycetes
- Order: Agaricales
- Family: Physalacriaceae
- Genus: Rhizomarasmius
- Species: R. undatus

Binomial name
- Rhizomarasmius undatus (Berk.) R.H. Petersen, 2000

Synonyms
- Marasmius undatus (Berk.) Fr., 1849

= Rhizomarasmius undatus =

Species of fungus

Rhizomarasmius undatus Mycological characteristics
- Gills on hymenium
- Cap is convex
- Hymenium is adnate or subdecurrent
- Stipe is bare
- Spore print is white
- Ecology is saprotrophic
- Edibility is unknown

Rhizomarasmius undatus (syn. Marasmius undatus) is a small mushroom which grows on fern rhizomes.

== Description ==
The species can be described as follows:

- The cap has a powdery covering (a pruina), is initially whitish and convex and later becomes brownish grey and expands to be flat. It grows to about 2.5 cm in diameter.
- The gills are whitish and distant, and broadly adnate to the stem, or slightly decurrent. The spore powder is white.
- The rigid stem can grow to about 12 cm long by about 2 mm in diameter. It is white at the top and dark brown to black lower down, with a puinose covering of short white hairs.
- The smell and taste are not distinctive.
- The spores are lemon-shaped to ellipsoid and measure roughly 9-12 μm x 5-7 μm.

== Naming and related species ==
The species epithet undatus, meaning "wavy", is the past participle of the Latin verb "undo" (= "I undulate").

This species was originally described in 1836 as Agaricus undatus by Miles Joseph Berkeley. As it happened, in 1838 the famous mycologist Elias Magnus Fries defined a completely different mushroom (now Entoloma undatum) under the same name, but due to the nomenclatural rules of precedence, that definition is illegitimate. This was confirmed when in 1849 Fries renamed Berkeley's fungus with the combination Marasmius undatus, a name which was current for more than a century. Then in 2000 it was one of the two initial species with which R. H. Petersen created the new genus Rhizomarasmius, the other one being the type species R. pyrrhocephalus.

== Ecology and distribution ==
This mushroom grows on rhizomes of bracken (Pteridium aquilinum) and probably other ferns. It is widespread but rare in northern and western Europe and has been reported from North Africa, North America, and the Altai Mountains.
