= Marasmius albopurpureus =

Scientific classification
- Kingdom: Fungi
- Division: Basidiomycota
- Class: Agaricomycetes
- Order: Agaricales
- Family: Marasmiaceae
- Genus: Marasmius
- Species: M. albopurpureus

Binomial name
- Marasmius albopurpureus T.H.Li & C.Q.Wang (2015)

Species of mushroom endemic to China

Marasmius albopurpureus is a species of mushroom-forming fungus that has only ever been observed in Baili Dao in Southern China. The mushroom grows on the subtropical island's floor, under Casuarina equisetifolia with varying degrees of abundance. The type specimen is housed at the fungal herbarium of the Guangdong Institute of Microbiology (GDGM).

M. albopurpureus is a part of the section Globulares of the genus Marasmius. This species has a grooved mushroom cap, white to purple in color, from 10–20 mm (0.4–0.8 in) wide. It also has cream to purple gills (lamellae), and has clear basidiospores that are 20–25 x 4–6 μm. The wrinkled, hollow stipe is 63–90 mm (2.5–3.5 in) tall, purple towards the top, and browner towards the bottom. This stipe differentiates it from the similar species in China, M. campestris (which has scales on the stipe) and M. subpurpureostriatus (which has a frosty pruina on the stipe), from the similar species in Japan, M. purpureostriatus (which has a purplish-grey to reddish brown stipe), and from the similar species in India, M. indopurpureostriatus and M. odoratus (which both have much longer stipes).
