= Marasmius funalis =

Scientific classification
- Kingdom: Fungi
- Division: Basidiomycota
- Class: Agaricomycetes
- Order: Agaricales
- Family: Marasmiaceae
- Genus: Marasmius
- Species: M. funalis

Binomial name
- Marasmius funalis Har. Takah. (2002)
- M. funalis is known only from Kanagawa prefecture, Japan

Species of fungus

Marasmius funalis is a species of Marasmiaceae fungus known only from Japan. The species produces small mushrooms with reddish-brown caps up to 6 millimetres (0.24 in) in diameter and dark-brown, threadlike stems of up to 50 millimetres (2.0 in) in length. The species has a number of distinctive microscopic features, including very long cystidia on the stem, visible as bristles. Described in 2002 by Haruki Takahashi, the species grows on dead wood. The closest relative of M. funalis is M. liquidambari, known from Mexico and Papua New Guinea, and it is also similar in appearance to M. hudonii and Setulipes funaliformis, the latter of which was named after M. funalis.

== Taxonomy ==
Marasmius funalis was first described and named in a 2002 article in Mycoscience by Haruki Takahashi, based on specimens collected in 2000. The specific name, funalis, is Latin for "rope-like", and is in reference to the shape and character of the stem. Within the genus Marasmius, the species has traits that suggest that it belongs in the section Androsacei, and, within the section, it seems most closely related to M. liquidambari. The Japanese common name for the species is Kenawatake (毛縄茸).

== Description ==
Marasmius funalis Mycological characteristics
- Gills on hymenium
- Cap is convex
- Hymenium is adnate or adnexed
- Stipe is bare
- Spore print is white
- Ecology is saprotrophic

Marasmius funalis produces fruit bodies in the form of mushrooms. Each mushroom has a convex (sometimes completely hemispherical) cap of between 2 and 6 mm (0.08 and 0.2 in) in diameter. Unlike the caps of other mushrooms, it does not change shape to a flatter convex with age. The cap is fairly smooth, but can have small, parallel furrows towards the edge, which are arranged radially. The colour differs slightly, depending on the age of the mushroom. While younger specimens sport reddish-brown caps, they are a paler brown in older mushrooms. The cap's surface is dry and dull, and free from hair. The threadlike stem attaches centrally to the cap, measures from 20 to 50 mm (0.8 to 2 in) long by 0.2 to 0.5 mm (0.008 to 0.02 in) thick. It is cylindrical, but may taper slightly, and is covered in short, white hairs. The base of the stem enters the substrate, and there are no rhizomorphs visible. The majority of the stem is blackish-brown, but it is a lighter brown at the very top.

The white gills can be adnate or adnexed; that is, they can be attached to the stem by their whole depth, or only part of it. The individual gills are distantly spaced, with between 8 and 12 reaching the stem. Each gill is up to 0.5 mm (0.02 in) thick, and the edges are even. There are sometimes lamellulae (short gills that do not reach the cap). There is a thin layer, up to 0.3 mm (0.01 in) thick, of whitish flesh in the cap. It is tough, but it can be bent without breaking. The flesh has no smell or taste.

=== Microscopic characteristics ===
Marasmius funalis mushrooms leave a white spore print. The individual basidiospores are ellipsoidal, and measure 6.5 to 8 by 4 to 5 micrometres (μm). They have thin cell walls, and they are smooth and colourless. The spores are inamyloid, meaning that they do not stain when they come into contact with iodine from Melzer's reagent or Lugol's solution. The spores are borne on club-shaped basidia measuring 20 to 25 by 4.5 to 7 μm, with two spores per basidium. There are also club-shaped basidioles (under-developed basidia).

The edge of the gill is sterile, made up of a mass of cystidia (cheilocystidia). The club-shaped cheilocystidia measure from 10 to 25 by 7 to 12 μm, and sport multiple cylindrical appendages on their tips, measuring 1 to 7 by 1 to 1.5 μm. The cheilocystidia are colourless, with cell walls of variable thickness, and are inamyloid. There are no pleurocystidia (cystidia on the face of the gills). The caulocystidia (cystidia in the stem) measure 60 to 200 by 4 to 7 μm. They are cylindrical and erect, forming the visible bristles. The tip is either pointed or rounded, and the cell walls are smooth and colourless, up to 2 μm thick. They are dextrinoid, meaning they stain a reddish-brown when they come into contact with iodine from Melzer's reagent or Lugol's solution.

The pileipellis, the top layer of hyphae in the cap, is a cutis. The cutis is made up of cylindrical hyphae between 2 and 5 μm thick. The inamyloid and thin-walled hyphae are covered in brown granules. The flesh in the cap is made up of cylindrical hyphae from 4 to 7 μm wide with thin cell walls. They are all generative hyphae, and run parallel to one another. They can be either inamyloid or only weakly dextrinoid. The flesh in the gills is basically the same as the flesh in the cap, but for the fact that it is completely inamyloid. The hyphae of the stipitipellis, the uppermost layer in the stem, also form a cutis. The cylindrical hyphae making up the cutis run parallel to one another, and measure from 2.5 to 4.5 μm in width, with walls up to 1 μm thick. They are encrusted with a brown pigment, and are dextrinoid. The flesh of the stem is made up of generative hyphae running lengthways (that is, up and down the stem). The cells are 5 to 8 μm wide, and are smooth and colourless; the cell walls up to 1 μm thick. They are dextrinoid. All M. funalis hyphae lack clamp connections.

=== Similar species ===
Marasmius funalis differs from its closest relative, M. liquidambari, due to the presence of cheilocystidia, the lack of clamp connections and the fact that the caulocystidia of M. liquidambari do not form bristles; instead, they are club shaped to cylindrical. The species is known from Mexico and Papua New Guinea. M. hudonii, known from Europe, is similar in appearance to M. funalis. However, the former has a cap covered in hairs or bristles, and differs microscopically; for instance, the hyphae feature clamp connections. The Malagasy species Setulipes funaliformis was named after M. funalis due to the morphological similarities between the two. The species can be differentiated by the fact that the basidiospores of S. funalformis are slightly larger and narrower, measuring from 7 to 10 by 3.5 to 4.5 μm, and the caulocystidia of M. funalis are significantly longer.

== Distribution and ecology ==
Marasmius funalis is known only from Kawasaki, Kanagawa and Machida, Tokyo, Japan. Mushrooms grow in groups on dead plant matter, and have been recorded on Japanese cedar (Cryptomeria japonica) wood and leaf litter in woodland mostly made up of Chonowski's hornbeam (Carpinus tschonoskii) and bamboo-leaf oak (Quercus myrsinifolia). The mushrooms can be encountered from May to July.

== See also ==
- List of Marasmius species
