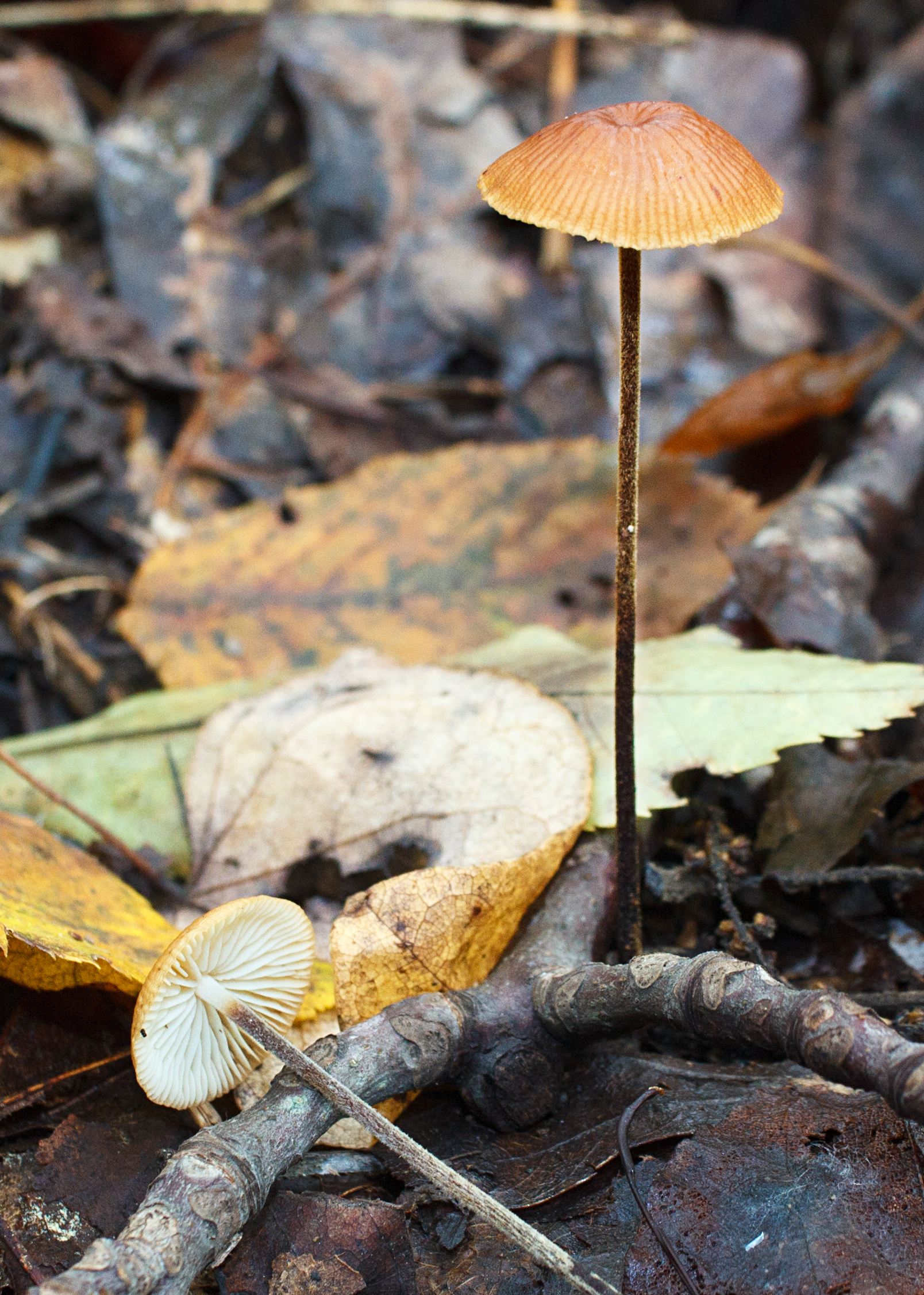
- Rhizomarasmius pyrrhocephalus

Scientific classification
- Kingdom: Fungi
- Division: Basidiomycota
- Class: Agaricomycetes
- Order: Agaricales
- Family: Physalacriaceae
- Genus: Rhizomarasmius; R.H.Petersen (2000)

Type species
- Rhizomarasmius pyrrhocephalus (Berk.) R.H.Petersen (2000)

Species
- R. epidryas R. oreinus R. pyrrhocephalus R. setosus R. undatus

= Rhizomarasmius =

Genus of fungi

Rhizomarasmius is a genus of fungi in the family Physalacriaceae, containing about five species.

== General ==
The genus was created in 2000 by R. H. Petersen to accommodate two species then classified in Marasmius (M. pyrrhocephalus and M. undatus), but which do not belong there due to morphological grounds, including the nature of the cystidia and the way the mushrooms are rooted on a plant substrate. This analysis was backed up in 2006 by DNA comparisons done by Wilson and Desjardin.

Unlike most Marasmius mushrooms, members of Rhizomarasmius grow on the rhizomes of ferns or flowering plants, and that is the signification of the genus name. Instead of the Marasmiaceae this genus is placed in the Physalacriaceae, a sister clade but a separate family.

== Species ==
Image	Name	Notes	Distribution
	R. epidryas		Arctic, Altai Mountains & mountains in Europe & N. America
	R. oreinus		
	R. pyrrhocephalus	Type species	N. America
	R. setosus	= Marasmius setosus, Marasmius recubans	Europe
	R. undatus		Europe, N. America, Altai Mountains

== See also ==
- List of Agaricales genera
