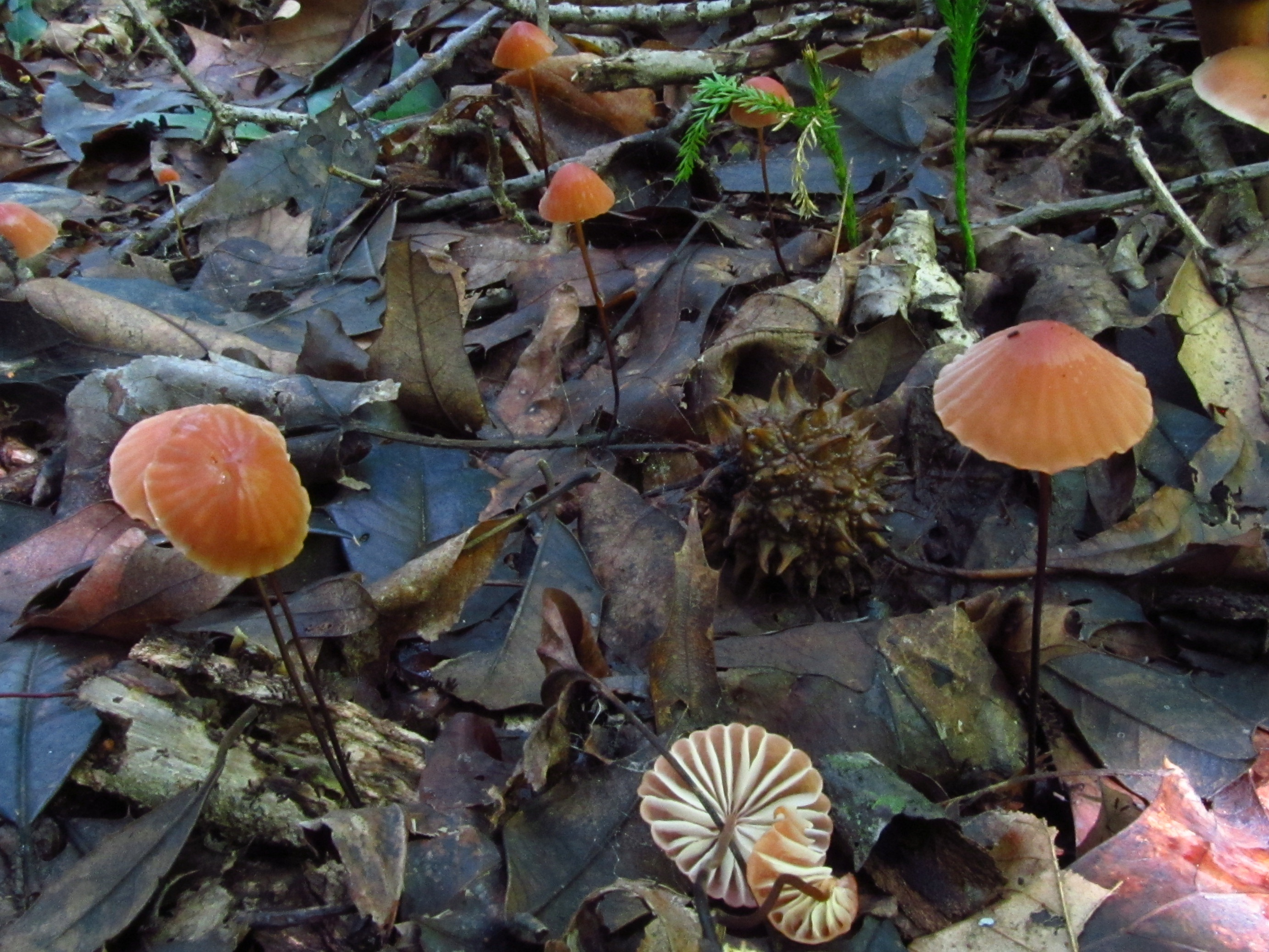

Scientific classification
- Domain: Eukaryota
- Kingdom: Fungi
- Division: Basidiomycota
- Class: Agaricomycetes
- Order: Agaricales
- Family: Marasmiaceae
- Genus: Marasmius
- Species: M. fulvoferrugineus

Binomial name
- Marasmius fulvoferrugineus Gilliam (1976)

= Marasmius fulvoferrugineus =

Species of fungus

Marasmius fulvoferrugineus is a species of agaric fungus in the family Marasmiaceae. Described as new to science in 1976, it is found in the southeastern United States. The mushroom is frequently confused with Marasmius siccus, and microscopy is needed to reliably distinguish between them.

== Taxonomy ==
The fungus was described as new to science in 1976 by mycologist Martina S. Gilliam. It has been classified in the section Sicci of the genus Marasmius, along with species like M. delectans, M. megistus, M. anomalus, and M. haematocephalus. However, molecular analysis has not provided evidence that these species form a distinct phylogenetically related group.

== Description ==
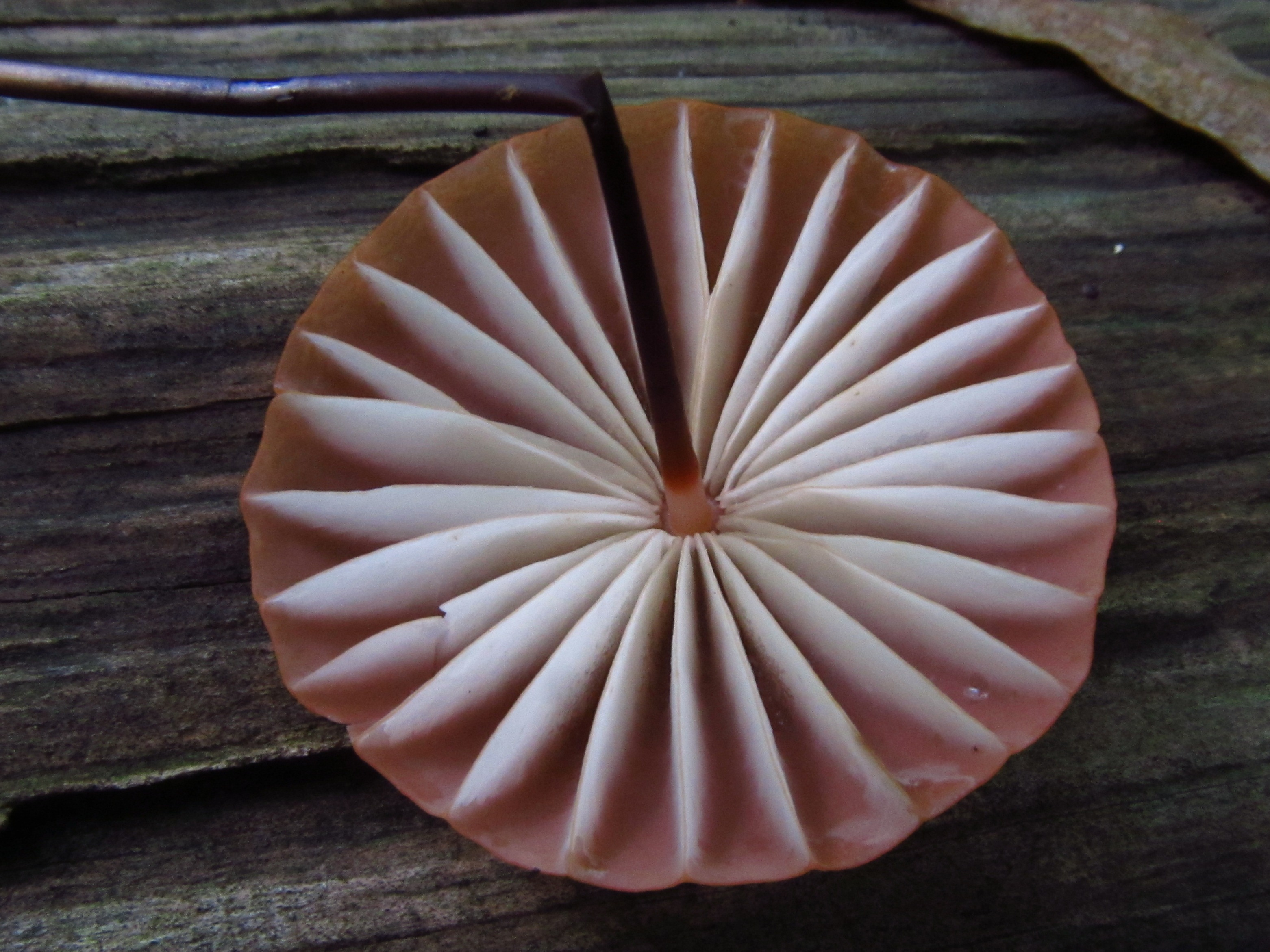
The gills are yellowish-white and distantly spaced.

The cap is initially cushion shaped or bell shaped before becoming convex, and it has a small umbo; it reaches a diameter of 2–4.5 cm (0.8–1.8 in). The cap surface is dry, somewhat velvety in texture, and has radial furrows extending to the edge of the cap as well as a pleated margin. The color ranges from tawny brown to rusty brown. The thin yellowish-white gills are up to 6 mm (0.24 in) broad, free from attachment to the stipe, and distantly spaced—there are typically 23–28 gills present. The stipe measures 5.4–8 cm (2.1–3.1 in) long by 1–1.25 mm thick, and is straight or curved, shiny, and hollow. It is dark brown except for a pink region near the top, and it has a tuft of cotton-like white mycelium at the base. The odor and taste of the mushroom are weakly farinaceous (similar to freshly-ground flour). The edibility of the fruit bodies has not been determined.

Marasmius fulvoferrugineus has a white spore print. The spores are shaped like lances (oblanceolate) or curved clubs, and are smooth, hyaline (translucent), and have dimensions of 15.2–18 by 3–4.5 μm. The basidia (spore-bearing cells) are club-shaped, four-spored, and measure 35–38 by 8–12 μm.

=== Similar species ===
Other Marasmius species readily confused with M. fulvoferrugineus include M. siccus and M. pulcherripes. A microscope is required to reliably distinguish M. fulvoferrugineus from M. siccus.

== Habitat and distribution ==
A saprobic fungus, Marasmius fulvoferrugineus fruits in groups or clusters on decaying leaves and humus in mixed woods. It is widely distributed in the southeastern USA, where it fruits in the summer and early fall.

== Bioactive compounds ==
Fruit bodies contain an antifungal antibiotic named fulvoferruginin. This compound has a sesquiterpenoid carotene skeleton and has shows strong activity against Gram-positive bacteria and significant antifungal activity towards Paecilomyces varioti.

== See also ==
- List of Marasmius species
