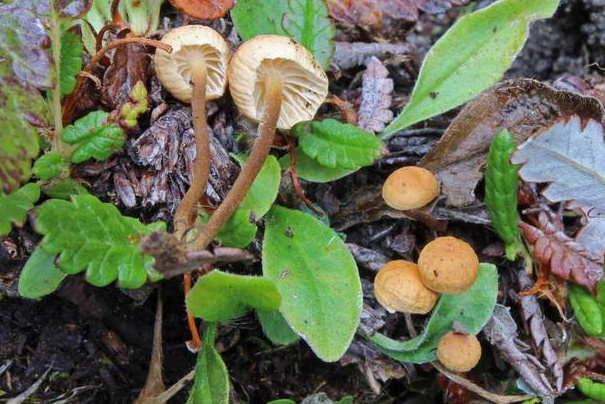

Scientific classification
- Kingdom: Fungi
- Division: Basidiomycota
- Class: Agaricomycetes
- Order: Agaricales
- Family: Physalacriaceae
- Genus: Rhizomarasmius
- Species: R. epidryas

Binomial name
- Rhizomarasmius epidryas (Kühner ex A. Ronikier) A. Ronikier & M. Ronikier, 2011

Synonyms
- Marasmius epidryas Kühner ex A. Ronikier, 2009; Mycetinis epidryas Kühner ex Antonín & Noordel., 2008

= Rhizomarasmius epidryas =

Species of fungus

Rhizomarasmius epidryas Mycological characteristics
- Gills on hymenium
- Cap is depressed or convex
- Hymenium is adnate
- Stipe is bare
- Spore print is white
- Ecology is saprotrophic
- Edibility is unknown

Rhizomarasmius epidryas (syn. Marasmius epidryas or Mycetinis epidryas) is one of a group of mushrooms formerly in the genus Marasmius. It grows amongst dwarf shrubs of the genus Dryas in arctic or high mountain environments.

== Description ==
The species can be described as follows:

- The cap is brownish yellow and grows to about 1 cm in diameter.
- The gills are white and fairly distant, and broadly attached to the stem. The spore powder is white.
- The stem can grow to 4 cm tall by up to 2 mm in diameter, being broader at the apex. It is brown above and blackish brown at the base, with a velvety covering of hairs.
- The smell and taste are not distinctive.
- The spores are roughly ellipsoid or almond-shaped and measure roughly 8.5-10.5 μm x 5-7 μm.

== Naming and related species ==
The species epithet is the Ancient Greek prefix "epi-" (ἐπί), meaning "on", followed by Dryas, the genus of plants with which it grows.

This species was originally described as Marasmius epidryas by Robert Kühner in 1935 in the annals of the Linnaean Society of Lyon, but the definition was considered invalid due to the lack of a Latin description according to the updated nomenclatural rules. In 2009 Anna Ronikier published a correct description ascribing the name to Kühner (that is, giving credit to him) and so the first valid name with author attribution was "Marasmius epidryas Kühner ex A. Ronikier". Then in 2011 Anna & Macheł Ronikier established that the species belongs in the new genus Rhizomarasmius and redefined the current name accordingly.

== Ecology and distribution ==
This mushroom is found exclusively in cushions of Dryas plants such as D. octopetala (mountain avens) and D. integrifolia (entire-leaved avens), growing saprobically on dead leaves and stems. It only occurs in arctic or high mountain environments.

It is reported from Arctic regions of Europe and North America, the Rocky and Altai mountains, and various mountain ranges in Europe.
