= Marasmius stenophyllus =

Scientific classification
- Kingdom: Fungi
- Division: Basidiomycota
- Class: Agaricomycetes
- Order: Agaricales
- Family: Marasmiaceae
- Genus: Marasmius
- Species: M. stenophyllus

Binomial name
- Marasmius stenophyllus Mont., (1854)

Species of fungus

Marasmius stenophyllus is a fungal plant pathogen.
