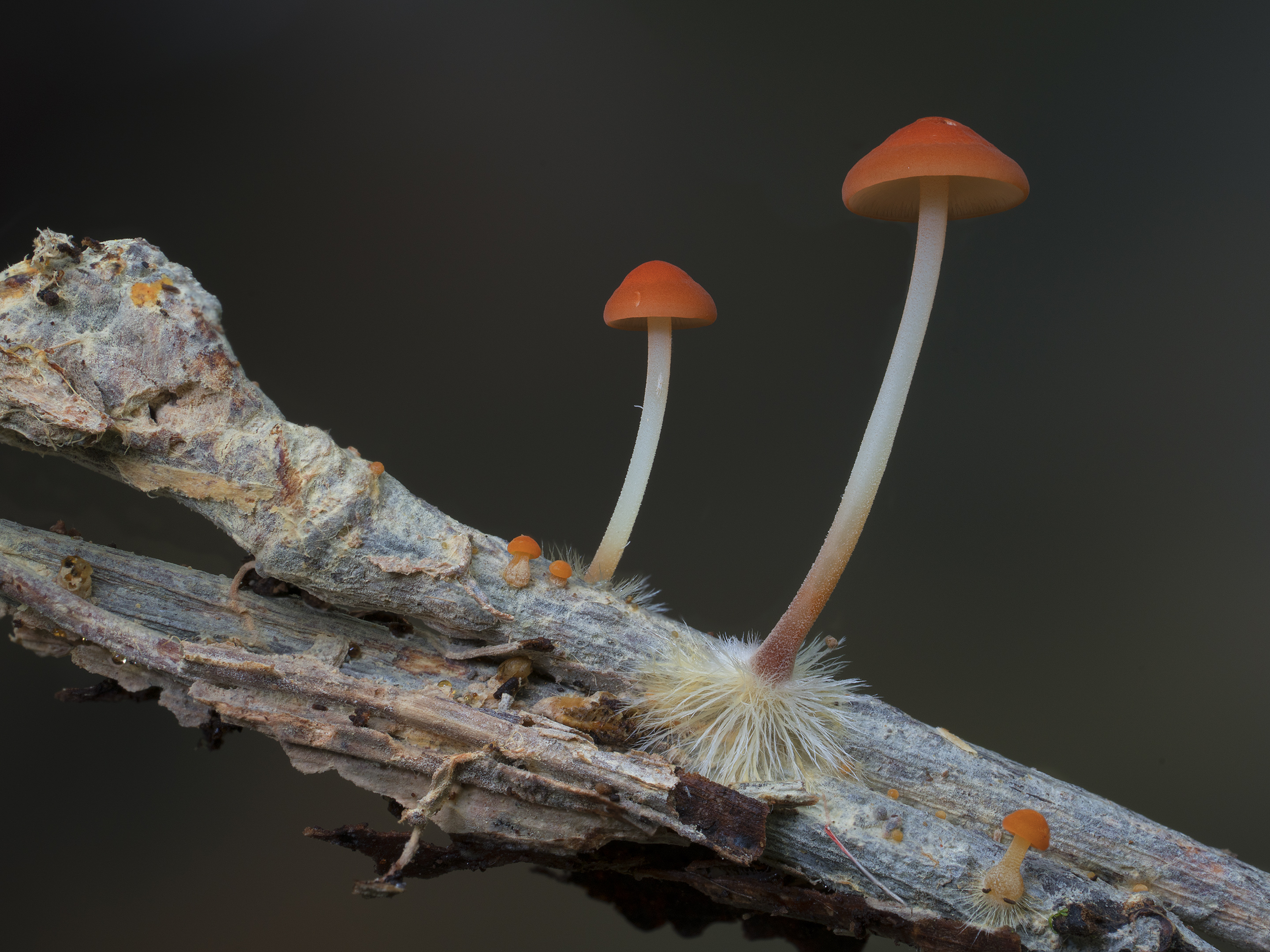

Scientific classification
- Domain: Eukaryota
- Kingdom: Fungi
- Division: Basidiomycota
- Class: Agaricomycetes
- Order: Agaricales
- Family: Marasmiaceae
- Genus: Marasmius
- Species: M. elegans

Binomial name
- Marasmius elegans (Cleland) Grgur. (1997)

Synonyms
- Collybia elegans Cleland (1933)

= Marasmius elegans =

Species of fungus

Marasmius elegans Mycological characteristics
- Gills on hymenium
- Cap is convex
- Hymenium is adnate
- Stipe is bare
- Spore print is white
- Ecology is saprotrophic
- Edibility is unknown

Marasmius elegans, commonly known as the velvet parachute, is a species of fungus in the family Marasmiaceae. It has a reddish-brown cap, and a whitish stipe with white hairs at the base. It can be found in eucalypt forests in Australia.

== Taxonomy ==
The species was originally described as Collybia elegans by the Australian mycologist John Burton Cleland in 1933. Cheryl Grgurinovic transferred it to Marasmius in a 1997 publication.

== See also ==
- List of Marasmius species
