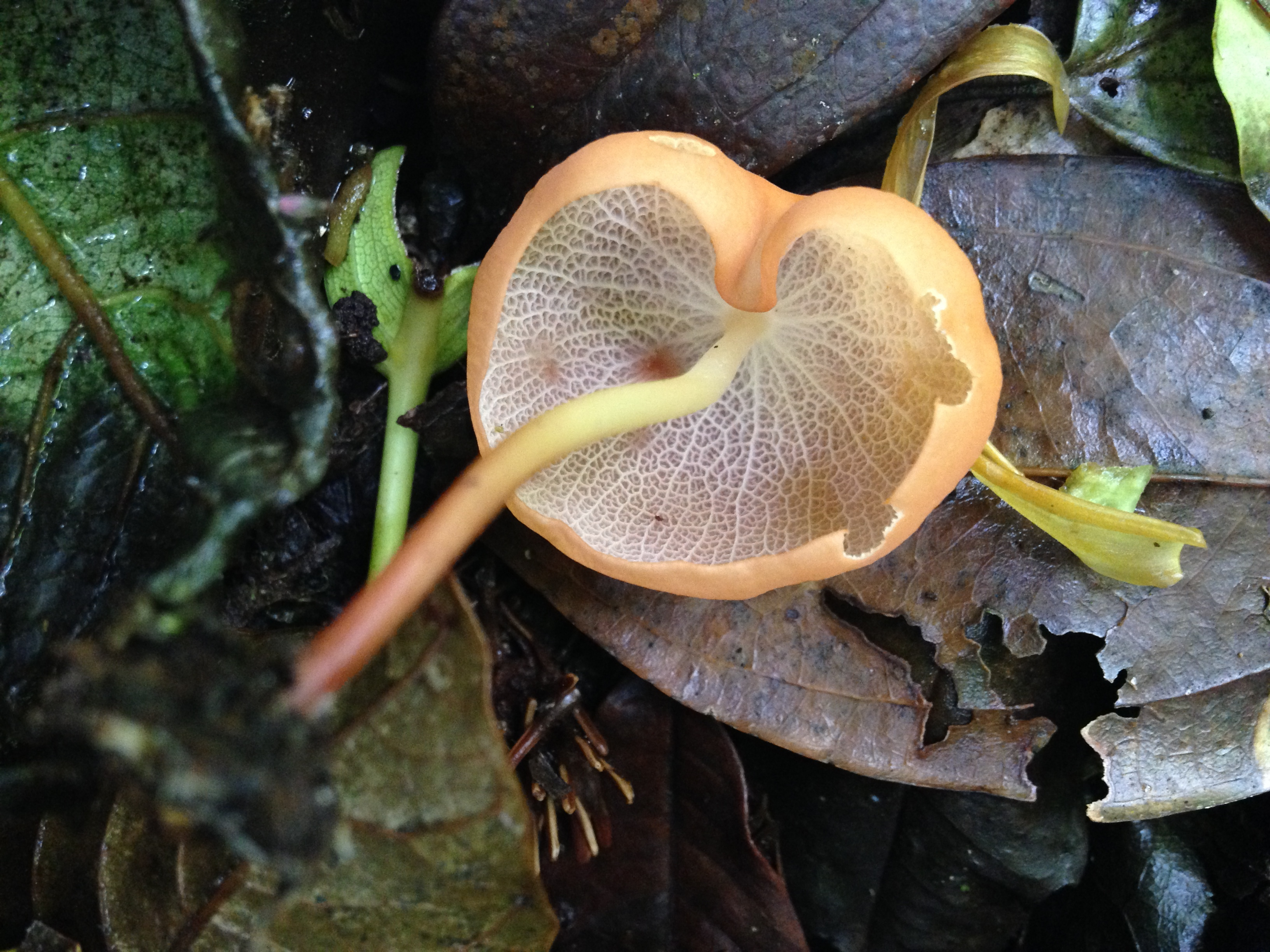

Scientific classification
- Domain: Eukaryota
- Kingdom: Fungi
- Division: Basidiomycota
- Class: Agaricomycetes
- Order: Agaricales
- Family: Marasmiaceae
- Genus: Marasmius
- Species: M. cladophyllus

Binomial name
- Marasmius cladophyllus Berk. (1856)

Synonyms
- Chamaeceras cladophyllus (Berk.) Kuntze (1898)

= Marasmius cladophyllus =

Species of fungus

Marasmius cladophyllus is a species of fungus in the family Marasmiaceae. Found in South America and Central America, it was described as new to science by English mycologist Miles Joseph Berkeley in 1856. A characteristic feature of the mushroom is the prominent ventricose (vein-like) pattern of the gills.
