= Marasmius semiustus =

Scientific classification
- Domain: Eukaryota
- Kingdom: Fungi
- Division: Basidiomycota
- Class: Agaricomycetes
- Order: Agaricales
- Family: Marasmiaceae
- Genus: Marasmius
- Species: M. semiustus

Binomial name
- Marasmius semiustus Berk. & M.A.Curtis (1869)

Synonyms
- Chamaeceras semiustus (Berk. & M.A.Curtis) Kuntze (1898); Marasmiellus semiustus (Berk. & M.A.Curtis) Singer (1948); Collybia semiusta (Berk. & M.A.Curtis) Dennis (1951)

Species of fungus

Marasmius semiustus is a species of fungus in the family Marasmiaceae. It is a plant pathogen responsible for banana plant disease commonly found in the West Indies. The only known remedy is the removal and burning of diseased plants.

This fungus is also found in Malaysia, Hawaii, Taiwan, and Costa Rica. It was first described scientifically in 1869.
