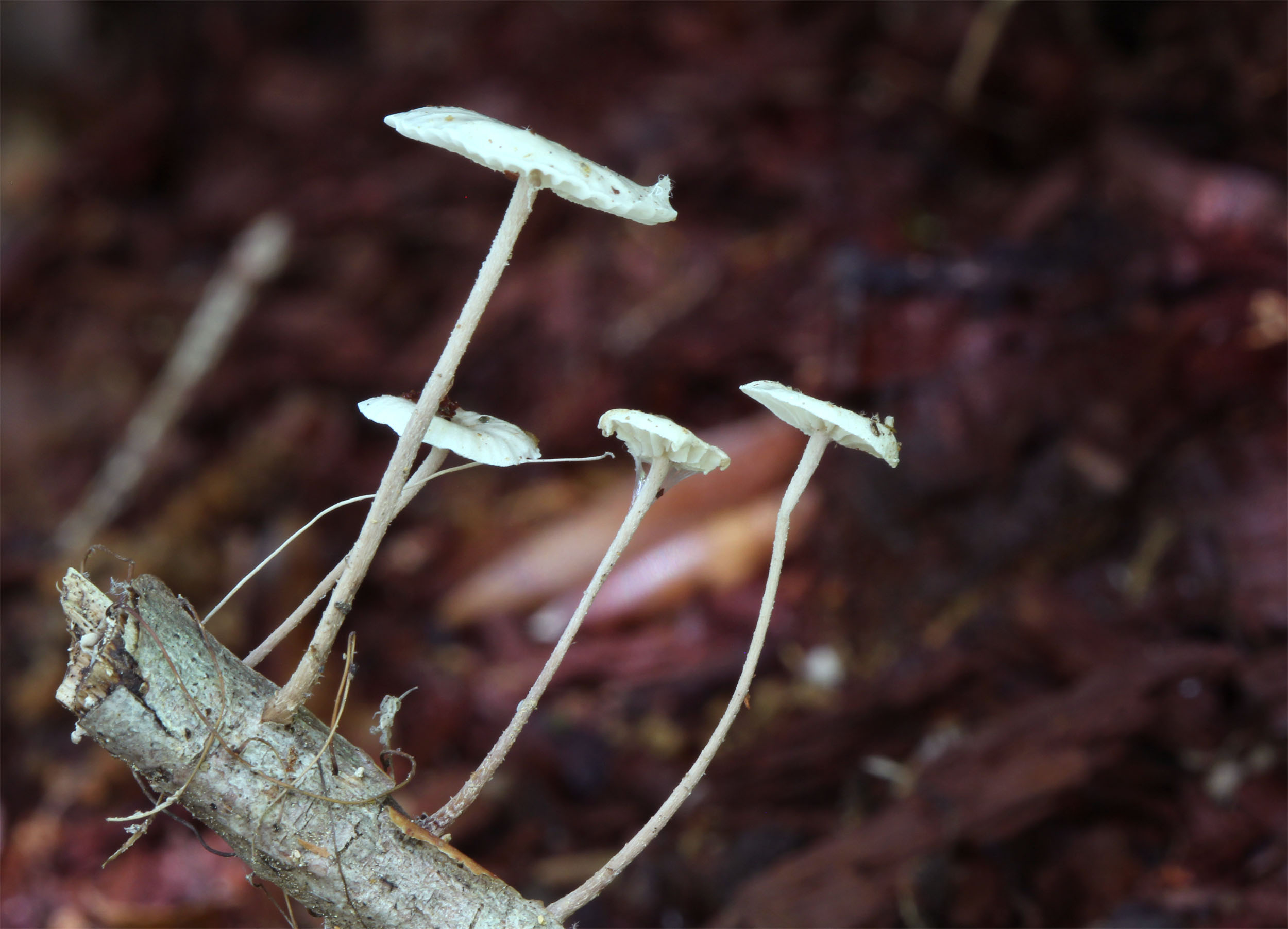

Scientific classification
- Domain: Eukaryota
- Kingdom: Fungi
- Division: Basidiomycota
- Class: Agaricomycetes
- Order: Agaricales
- Family: Omphalotaceae
- Genus: Mycetinis
- Species: M. opacus

Binomial name
- Mycetinis opacus (Berk. & M.A.Curtis) A.W.Wilson and Desjardin (2005)

Synonyms
- Marasmius opacus Berk. & M.A.Curtis (1849); Chamaeceras opacus (Berk. & M.A.Curtis) Kuntze (1898); Marasmiellus opacus (Berk. & M.A.Curtis) Singer (1951); Gymnopus opacus (Berk. & M.A.Curtis) J.L.Mata & R.H.Petersen (2004)

= Mycetinis opacus =

Species of fungus

Mycetinis opacus is a species of agaric fungus first described in 1849 by Miles Joseph Berkeley and Moses Ashley Curtis as Marasmius opacus. Andrew Wilson and Dennis Desjardin transferred it to Mycetinis in 2005.

The cap reaches only to about 2 centimetres (3/4 in) in diameter. The stem is up to 5 cm (2 in) long and the spore print is white. The species has conspicuous pale mycelial cords and unlike some other members of its genus, it does not smell of garlic.

It is found in eastern North America (May–September) and rarely in Japan, growing especially on dead Rhododendron material, but also on debris of oak, pine, and eastern hemlock.
