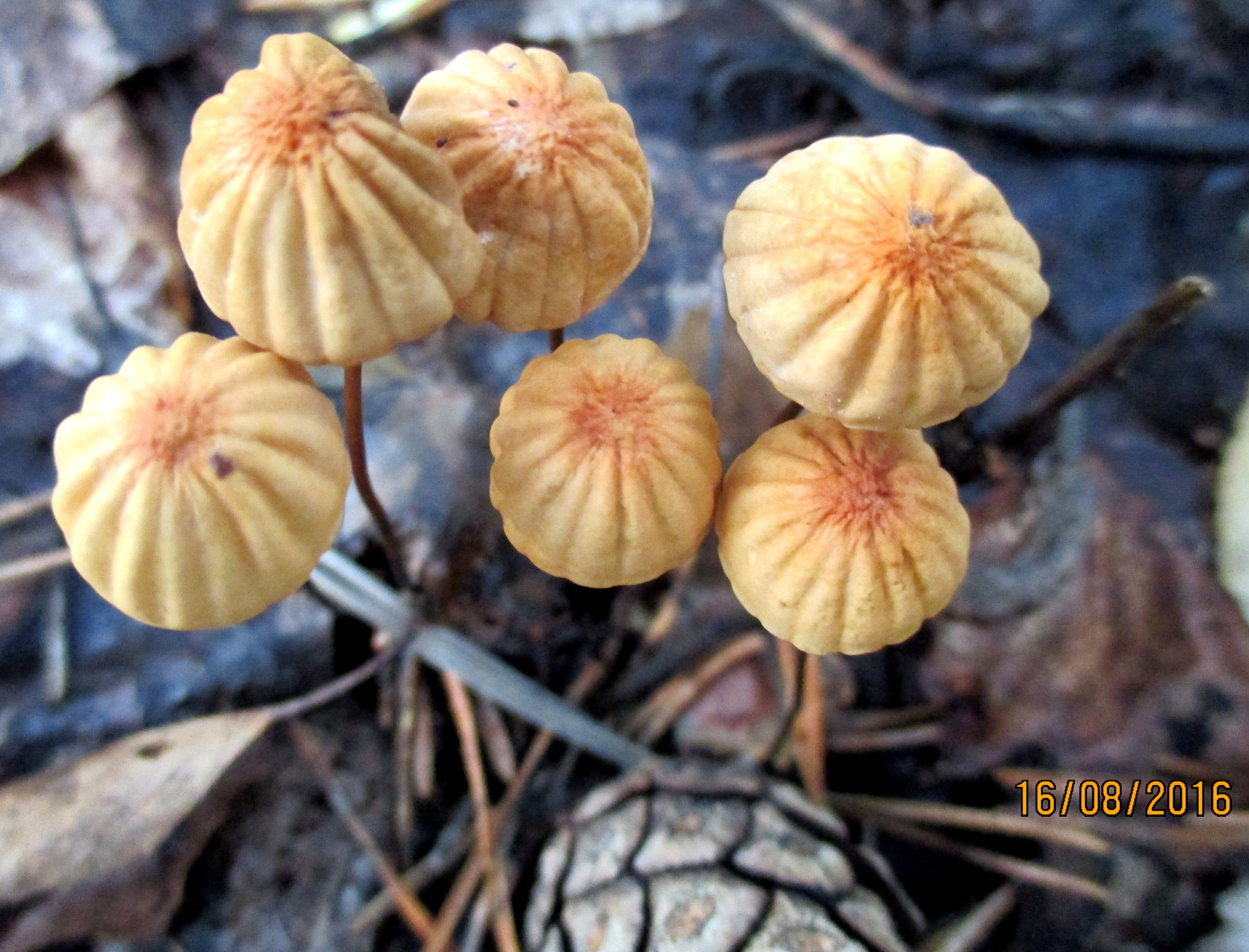

Scientific classification
- Domain: Eukaryota
- Kingdom: Fungi
- Division: Basidiomycota
- Class: Agaricomycetes
- Order: Agaricales
- Family: Marasmiaceae
- Genus: Marasmius
- Species: M. siccus

Binomial name
- Marasmius siccus Schwein. ex Fr.

= Marasmius siccus =

Species of fungus

Marasmius siccus, or orange pinwheel, is a species of fungus in the Marasmius genus. It is found in Eurasia and eastern North America.

== Description ==
The small orange mushroom has an umbrella-shaped cap which is 0.5–2.5 centimetres (1/4–1 in) wide. The gills are whitish. The tough shiny bare stem is pale at the top but reddish brown below, and 3–7 cm (1 1/4–2 3/4 in) tall.

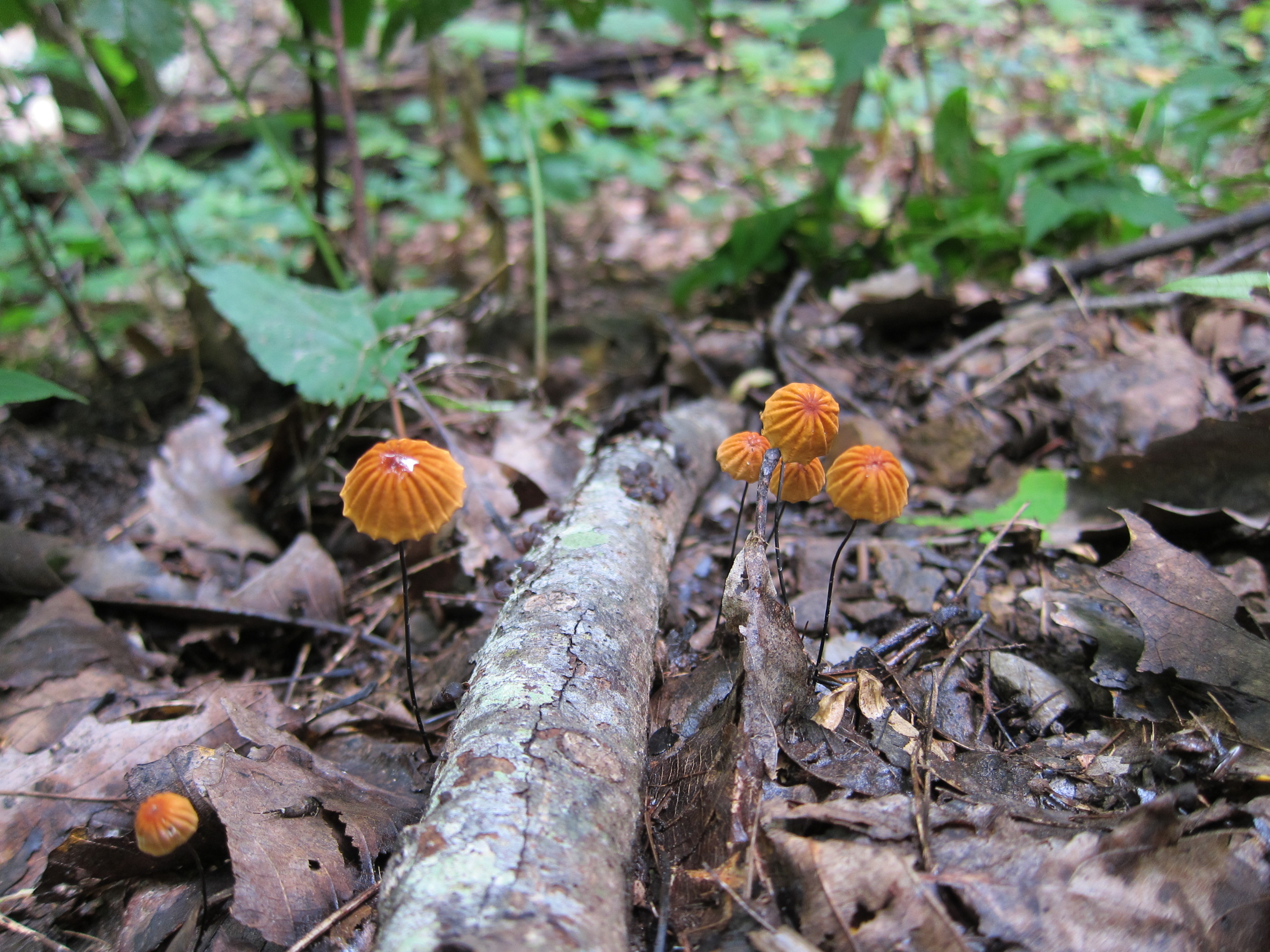
A cluster of M. siccus

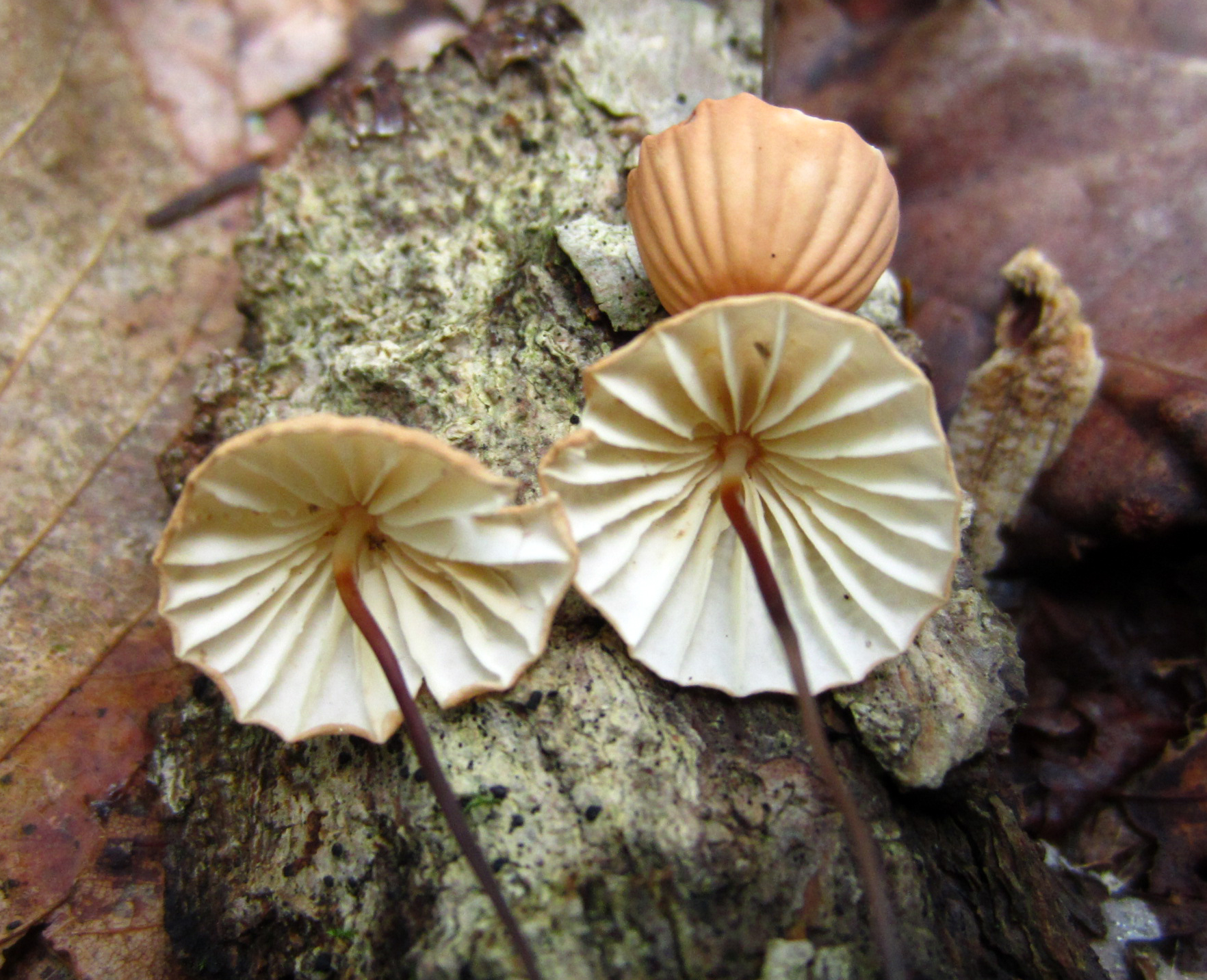
Gills and the stem, which lightens at the top

=== Microscopic details ===
At a microscopic level, the club-shaped spores are very long and thin, being roughly 19 μm by 4 μm. The distinctive cheilocystidia are broadly club-shaped with finger-like protrusions at the far end. Such cells also sometimes occur in other related mushrooms and they are known as "broom cells of the siccus type".

=== Similar species ===
M. fulvoferrugineus and M. pulcherripes are similar, but the caps are more pink.

== Habitat and distribution ==
This mushroom is found in hardwood forests. It is distributed in northern Europe and Asia, and in North America from July to September, from the Rocky Mountains to the Appalachians.

== Edibility ==
Although nonpoisonous, the mushrooms are too small to be considered worthwhile as food.
