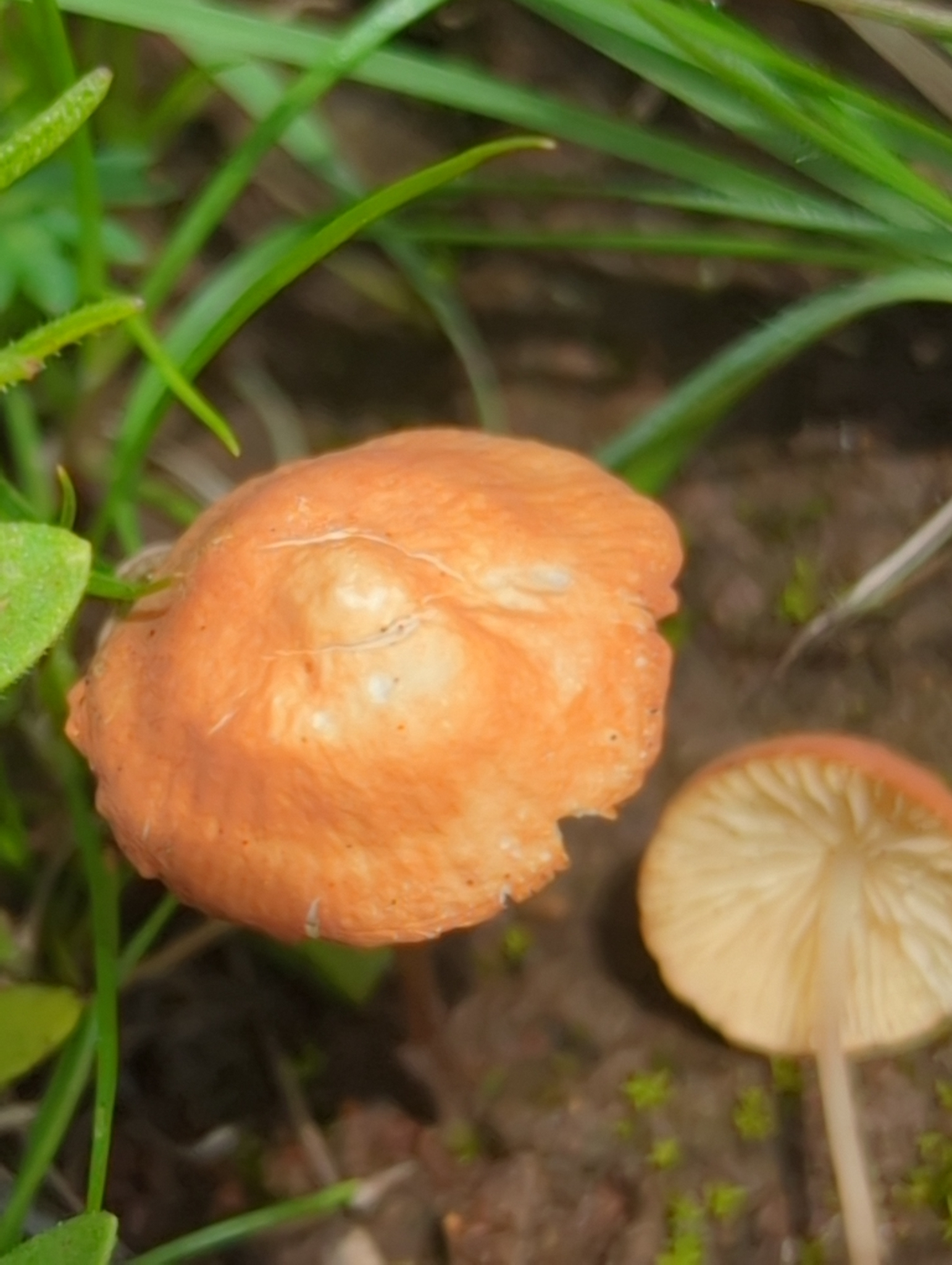

Scientific classification
- Domain: Eukaryota
- Kingdom: Fungi
- Division: Basidiomycota
- Class: Agaricomycetes
- Order: Agaricales
- Family: Marasmiaceae
- Genus: Marasmius
- Species: M. vagus

Binomial name
- Marasmius vagus F.E.Guard, M.D.Barrett & Farid

= Marasmius vagus =

Species of fungus

Marasmius vagus, the wandering creamsicle or wandering parachute, is a small bright orange gilled mushroom in the family Marasmiaceae.

== Etymology ==
The Greek language word marasmos means "drying out" and was applied to this genus because some members have an ability to dry out and then revive with moisture. Members of the genus produce white spores and have a central stipe (stem or stalk) that is often tough or wiry. Vagus refers to their geographical spreading as with a vagabond or vagrant.

== Description ==
The orange cap is 2–3.5 centimetres (3/4–1 1/2 in) wide. The white gills are adnexed. The stem is usually not centered or straight, growing up to 6.5 cm (2 1/2 in) long and 5 mm (1/4 in) thick. Both the flesh and spore print are white.

== Distribution and habitat ==
Native to northern Australia, they commonly grow in lawns in Florida where the brightly colored mushrooms are found growing in clusters and partial fairy rings.

== Cautions ==
It is not believed to be toxic but it resembles some poisonous mushrooms.
