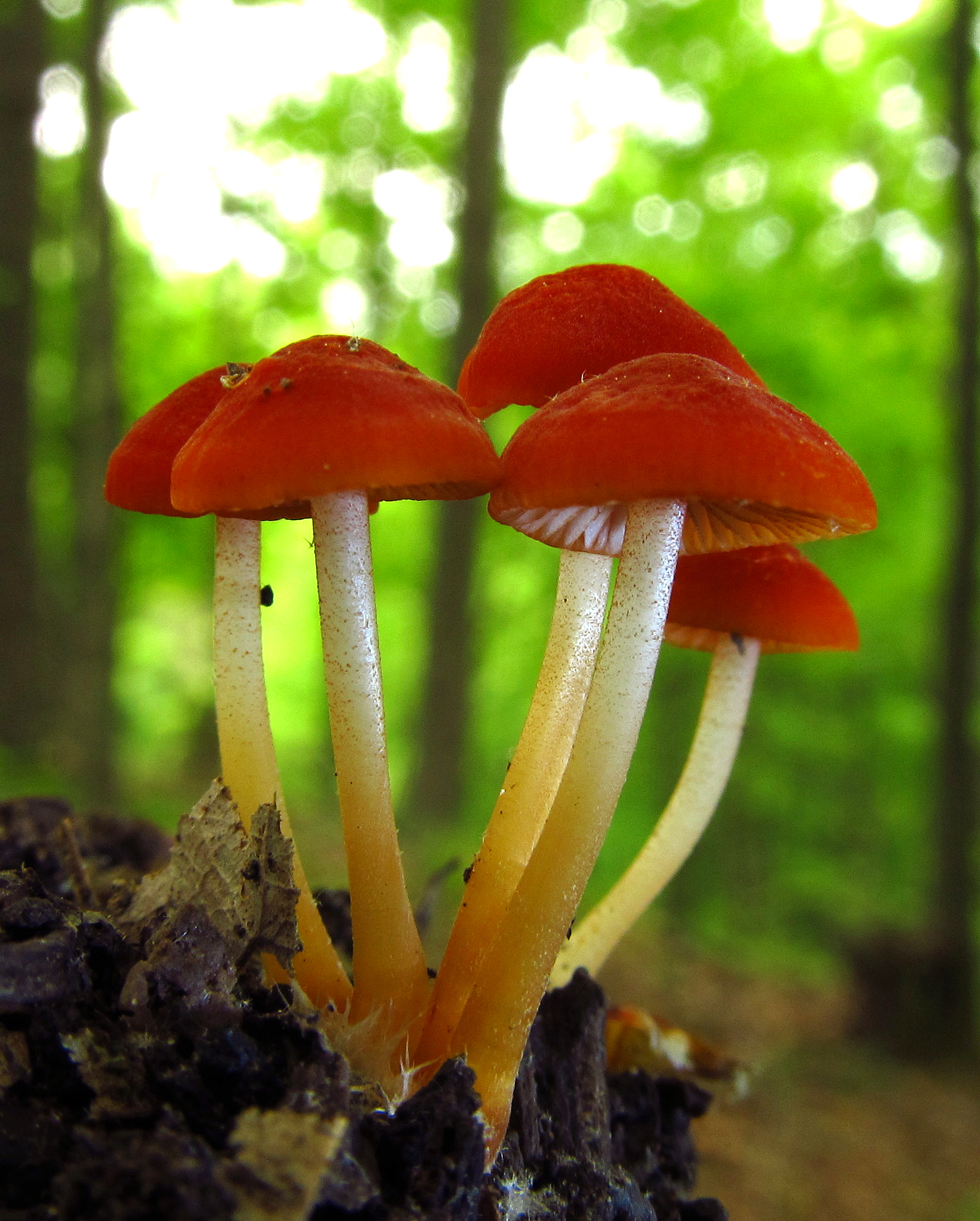

Scientific classification
- Domain: Eukaryota
- Kingdom: Fungi
- Division: Basidiomycota
- Class: Agaricomycetes
- Order: Agaricales
- Family: Marasmiaceae
- Genus: Marasmius
- Species: M. sullivantii

Binomial name
- Marasmius sullivantii Mont. (1856)

Synonyms
- Chamaeceras sullivantii (Mont.) Kuntze (1898)

= Marasmius sullivantii =

Species of fungus

Marasmius sullivantii is a species of fungus in the family Marasmiaceae. The species was originally described by the French botanist Jean Pierre François Camille Montagne in 1856.
