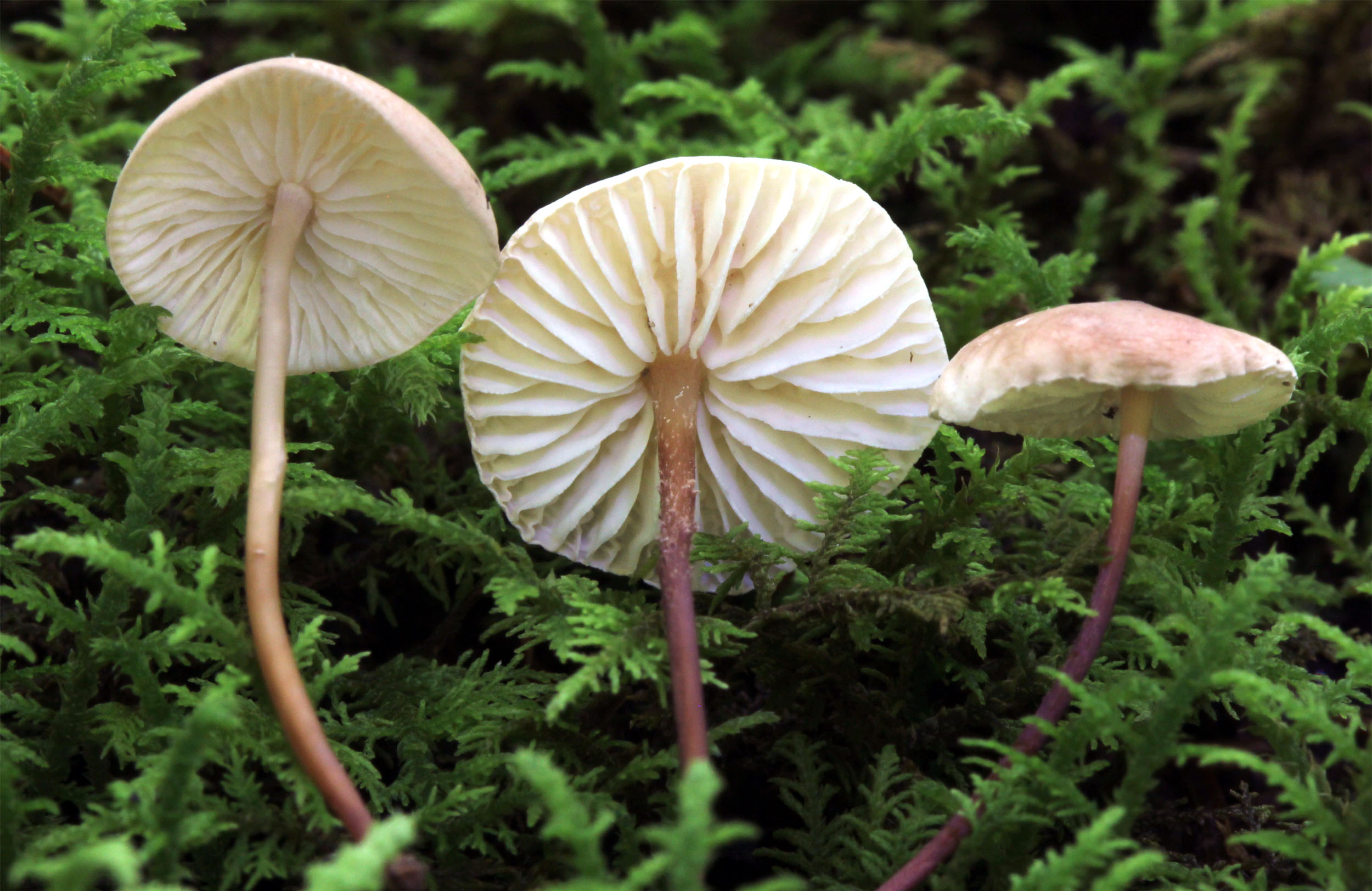

Scientific classification
- Kingdom: Fungi
- Division: Basidiomycota
- Class: Agaricomycetes
- Order: Agaricales
- Family: Omphalotaceae
- Genus: Mycetinis
- Species: M. scorodonius

Binomial name
- Mycetinis scorodonius (Fr.) A.W. Wilson & Desjardin, 2005

Synonyms
- Agaricus scorodonius Fr., 1815; Marasmius scorodonius (Fr.) Fr., 1826; Chamaeceras scorodenius (Fr.) Kuntze, 1898; Gymnopus scorodonius (Fr.) J.L. Mata & R.H. Petersen, 2004; Mycetinis scorodonius var. scorodonius (Fr.) A.W. Wilson & Desjardin, 2005

= Mycetinis scorodonius =

Species of fungus

Mycetinis scorodonius
- Mycological characteristics
- Gills on hymenium
- Cap is convex
- Hymenium is adnate or adnexed
- Stipe is bare
- Spore print is white
- Ecology is saprotrophic
- Edibility is edible

Mycetinis scorodonius (syn. Marasmius scorodonius) is one of the garlic-scented mushrooms formerly in the genus Marasmius, having a beige cap of up to 3 cm and a tough slender stipe.

== Taxonomy ==
This species was originally documented as Agaricus scorodonius by Fries in 1815 and in 1836 the same author established its long-standing designation Marasmius scorodonius. However following a 2005 paper it was decided to separate a group of garlic-smelling species, including this one, off into genus Mycetinis.

Mycetinis virgultorum is (according to Species Fungorum) a closely related species, or (according to Antonín and Noordeloos) a variety within the same species. In the latter classification, the two forms are called M. scorodonius var. scorodonius and M. scorodonius var. virgultorum. The virgultorum form has smaller fruiting bodies, a scaly dull stem, and smaller spores.

An infra-species-level taxon, Marasmius scorodonius forma diminutivus was described in 2017 by Petersen et al. This form is smaller, growing only to a cap diameter of 1 cm, and it has only been found in urban environments in Washington state.

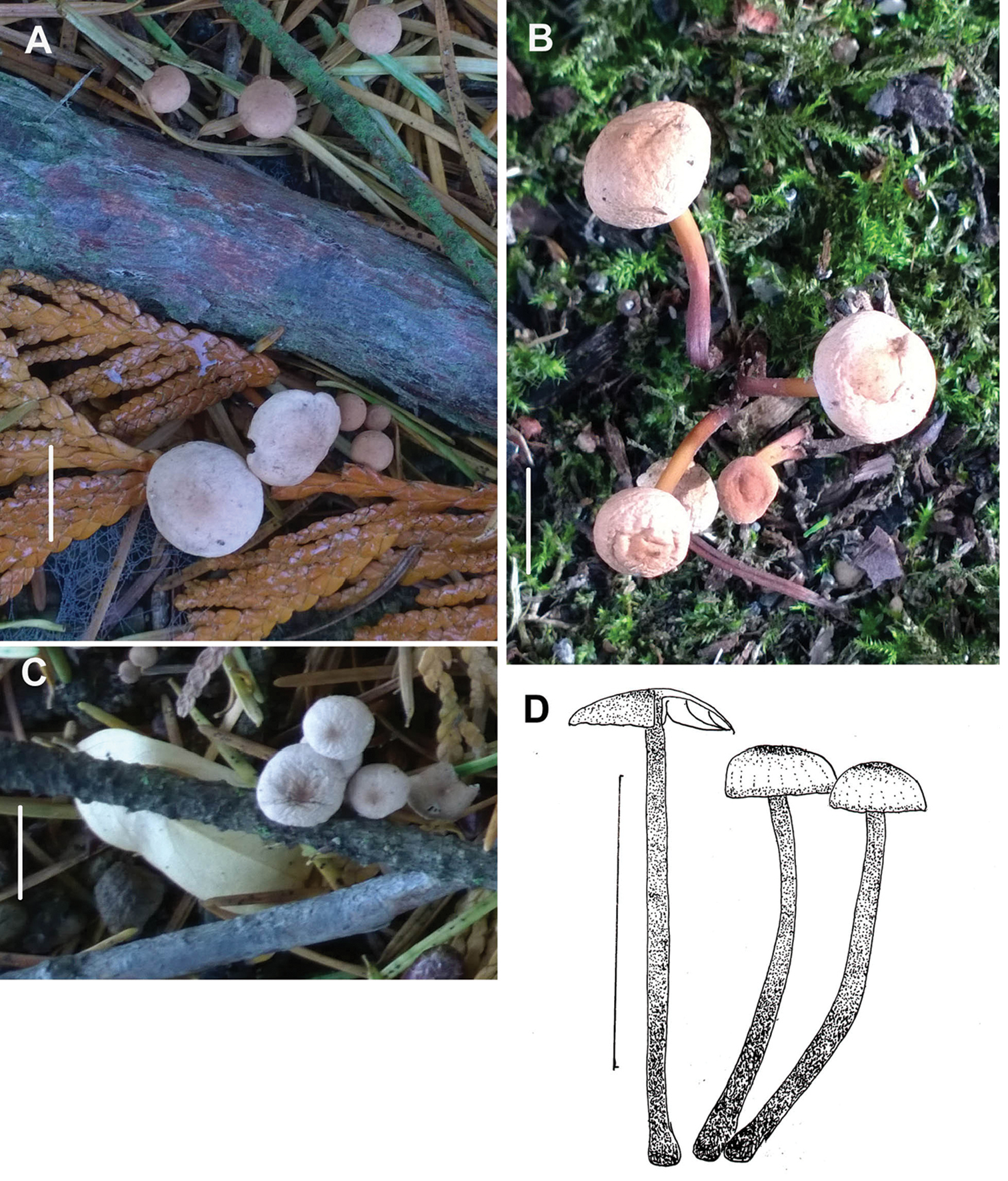
M. scorodonius f. diminutivus

=== Etymology ===
The species epithet is a Latin adjectival form of the Greek word for garlic, scorodon (σκόροδον).

== Description ==
The species can be described as follows:

- The cap is red brown (or sometimes beige to ochre) and is hygrophanous, drying to a paler colour. It is sometimes slightly wrinkled and grows to 1–3 cm in diameter.
- The gills are white and fairly crowded, and the attachment to the stem varies from adnate to almost free. The spore powder is white.
- The stem can grow to 6 cm tall but is only up to 2 mm in diameter. It is bald and pale at the apex, reddish brown lower down, and dark brown or blackish at the base.
- The smell and taste are strongly of garlic.
- The spores are roughly ellipsoid and measure 7–11 μm x 3–5 μm.
- The cheilocystidia (on the gill edge) are of the "broom cell" type, that is, they are club-shaped with a number of finger-like protuberances.

== Ecology and distribution ==
This mushroom is found from summer to late autumn especially on conifer needles, but also on sticks and other debris, on bark of conifers and deciduous trees, and on grasses and other plants. While usually a saprophyte, it has also been reported as a parasite of grass.

It is fairly common in northern and central Europe, present in the remainder of Europe, and reported from eastern North America, North Africa and Asia, including Israel.

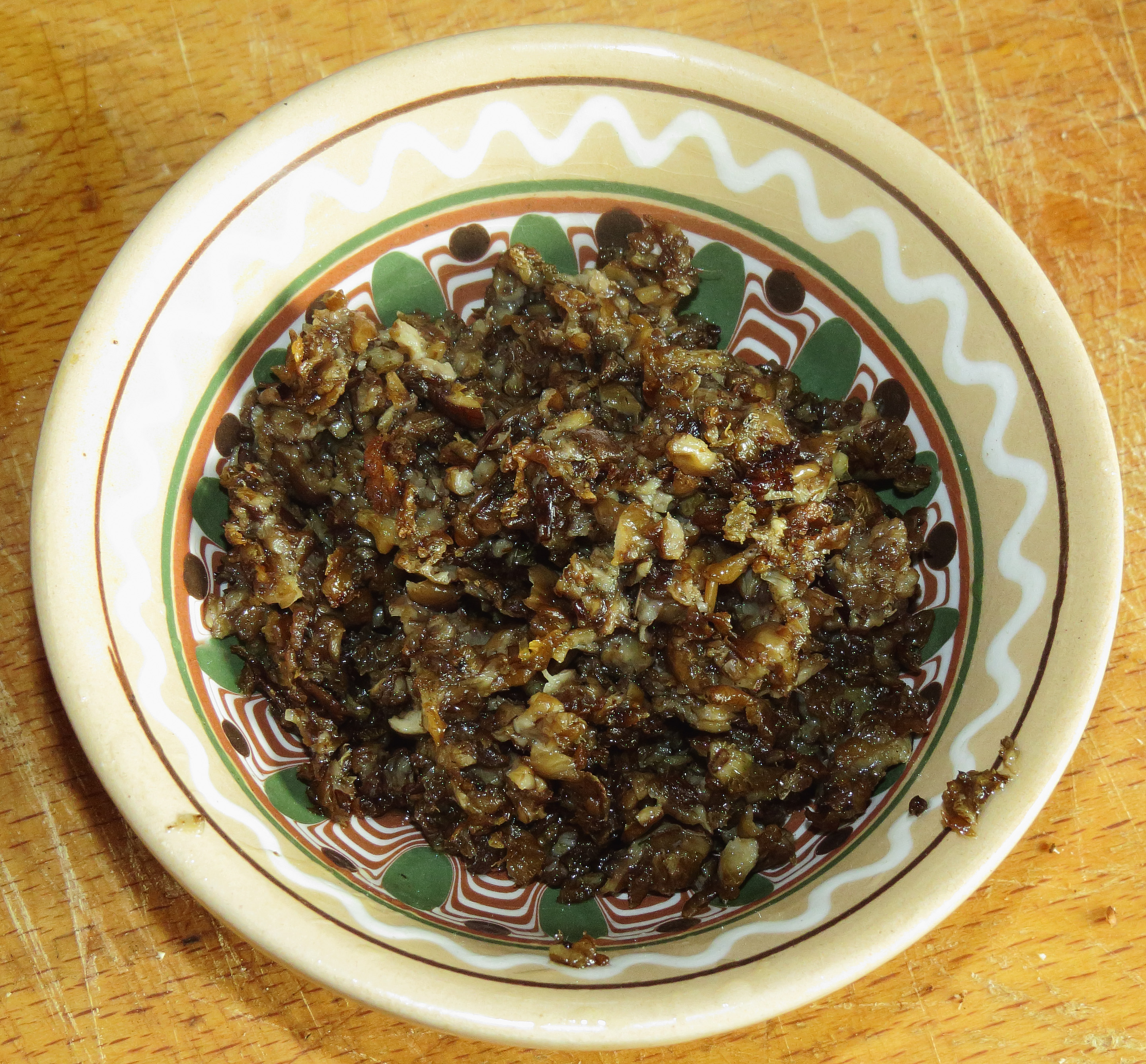
Fried dish

== Edibility ==
The taste of M. scorodonius is often described as nasty or unpleasant. Although edible, it is too small to be substantial. It can be used to add a garlic flavour to dishes.
