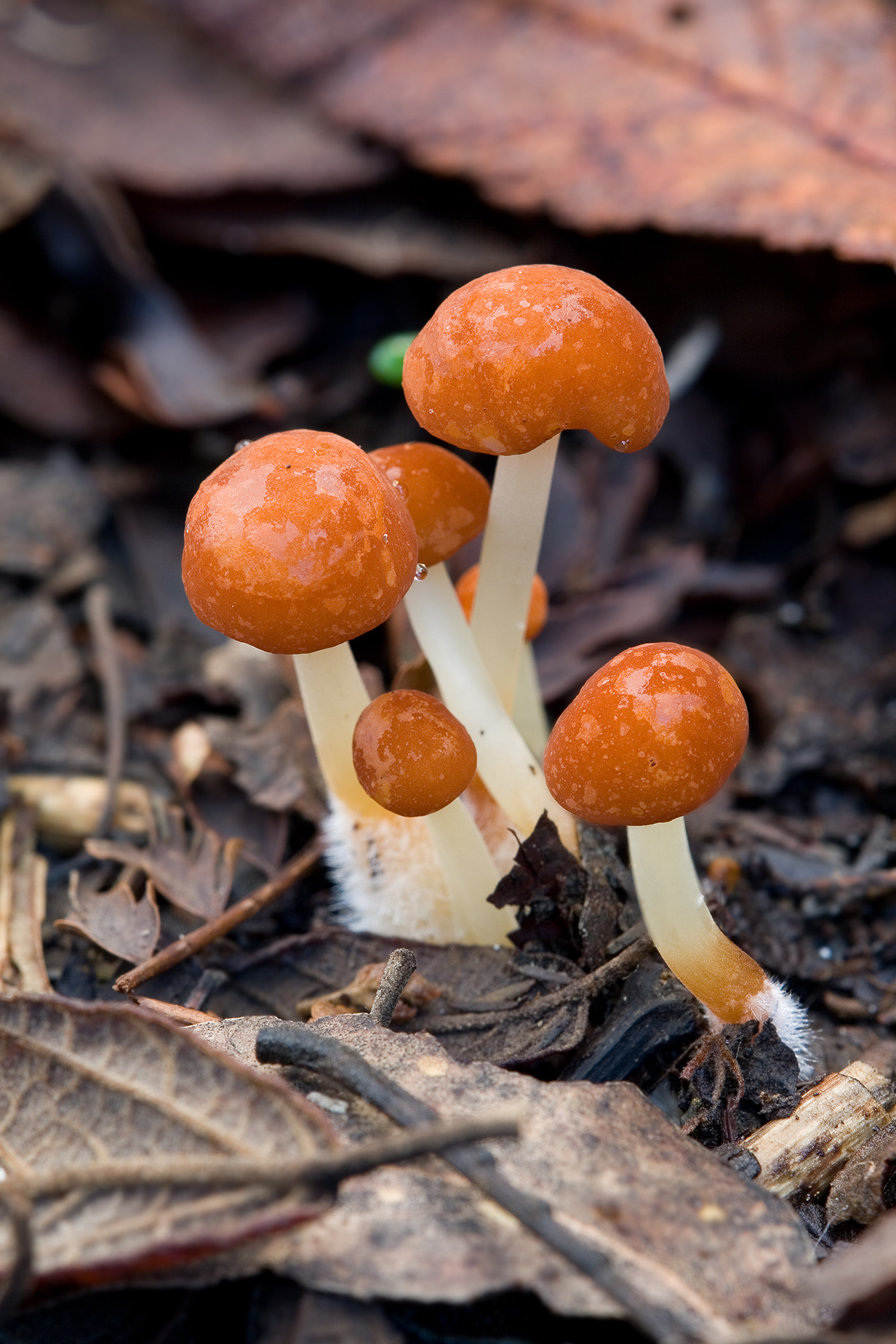
- Marasmius elegans

Scientific classification
- Kingdom: Fungi
- Division: Basidiomycota
- Class: Agaricomycetes
- Order: Agaricales
- Family: Marasmiaceae
- Genus: Marasmius; Fr. (1836)

Type species
- Marasmius rotula (Scop.) Fr. (1838)

= Marasmius =

Genus of fungi

Marasmius
- Mycological characteristics
- Gills on hymenium
- Cap is convex
- Hymenium is adnate
- Stipe is bare
- Spore print is white
- Ecology is saprotrophic

Marasmius is a genus of mushroom-forming fungi in the family Marasmiaceae. It contains about 500 species of agarics, of which a few, such as Marasmius oreades, are edible. However, most members of this genus are small, unimpressive brown mushrooms. Their humble appearance contributes to their not being readily distinguishable to non-specialists, and they are therefore seldom collected by mushroom hunters. Several of the species are known to grow in the characteristic fairy ring pattern.

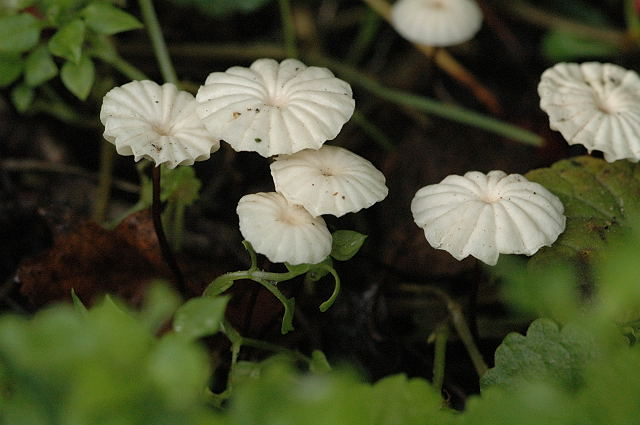
Marasmius rotula

The author of the genus was Elias Magnus Fries, who in 1838 classified white-spored agarics having a tough central stipe in this taxon if they were marcescent, i.e. they could dry out but later revive when moistened. For Fries, marcescence—by contrast with the "putrescent" (decomposing) nature of most mushrooms—was an important character for classification, which he used to separate this group from genus Collybia (which has now been split into many newer genera). The name Marasmius itself comes from the Greek word marasmos, meaning "drying out; withering". Modern mycologists no longer consider the marcescence/putrescence distinction a reliable criterion for taxonomy, but Fries's definition of the genus is still roughly applicable.

Adults of the pleasing fungus beetles Tritoma erythrocephala and T.mimetica have been recorded from unspecified "Marasmius", but this could refer to numerous species of Marasmiaceae, Omphalotaceae or Physalacriaceae. Whatever those mushrooms' identity, they does not seem to be a regular food source for T.erythrocephala, while the T.mimetica record conceivably refers to one of the Physalacriaceae on which adults of this beetle usually feed.

== Species ==
Below is a list of more prominent species (for a complete list see List of Marasmius species). Note that some well-known former members of Marasmius, such as M. alliaceus, have been moved into the new genus Mycetinis; a few others have been reclassified as Rhizomarasmius or Gloiocephala. Former M. androsaceus is now considered to belong to genus Gymnopus.

- M. albopurpureus
- M. amazonicus
- M. anomalus
- M. atrocastaneus
- M. auklandicus
- M. aurantiobasalis
- M. bambusinus
- M. bellus
- M. bulliardii
- M. buxi - box parachute
- M. caperatus
- M. capillaris
- M. caricis
- M. chordalis
- M. cladophyllus
- M. cohaerens
- M. collinus
- M. corbariensis
- M. crinis-equi
- M. croceus
- M. curranii
- M. curreyi
- M. cylindraceocampanulatus
- M. delicatus
- M. delectans
- M. elegans - velvet parachute
- M. epiphylloides - ivy parachute
- M. epiphyllus - leaf parachute
- M. exocarpi
- M. exustoides
- M. favrei
- M. fishii
- M. fulvoferrugineus
- M. funalis
- M. galbinus
- M. gelatinosipes
- M. graminum
- M. haematocephalus - purple pinwheel mushroom
- M. hudsonii - holly parachute
- M. indopurpureostriatus
- M. insititius
- M. kanukaneus
- M. koae
- M. kroumirensis
- M. limosus
- M. masonii
- M. meridionalis
- M. micraster
- M. midnapurensis
- M. minutus
- M. nigripes
- M. oreades - fairy ring mushroom
- M. otagensis
- M. pallenticeps
- M. palmivorus
- M. perforans
- M. perpusillus
- M. phalaricola
- M. podocarpicola
- M. prasiosmus
- M. pulcherripes
- M. pyrrhocephalus
- M. pusillissimus
- M. pusio
- M. quercophilus
- M. resinosus
- M. rhombisporus
- M. rhopalostylidis
- M. rimuphilus
- M. rosulatus
- M. rotula - collared parachute or pinwheel mushroom
- M. sacchari
- M. saccharinus
- M. sasicola
- M. semiustus
- M. setosus
- M. siccus
- M. spaniophyllus
- M. splachnoides
- M. subsupinus
- M. stenophyllus
- M. strictipes (edible)
- M. sullivantii
- M. tageticolor
- M. tenuiparietalis
- M. tenuissimus
- M. tinctorius
- M. torquescens
- M. unilamellatus
- M. vagus - wandering creamsicle
- M. wettsteinii
- M. wynneae - pearly parachute

== See also ==
- List of Marasmiaceae genera
