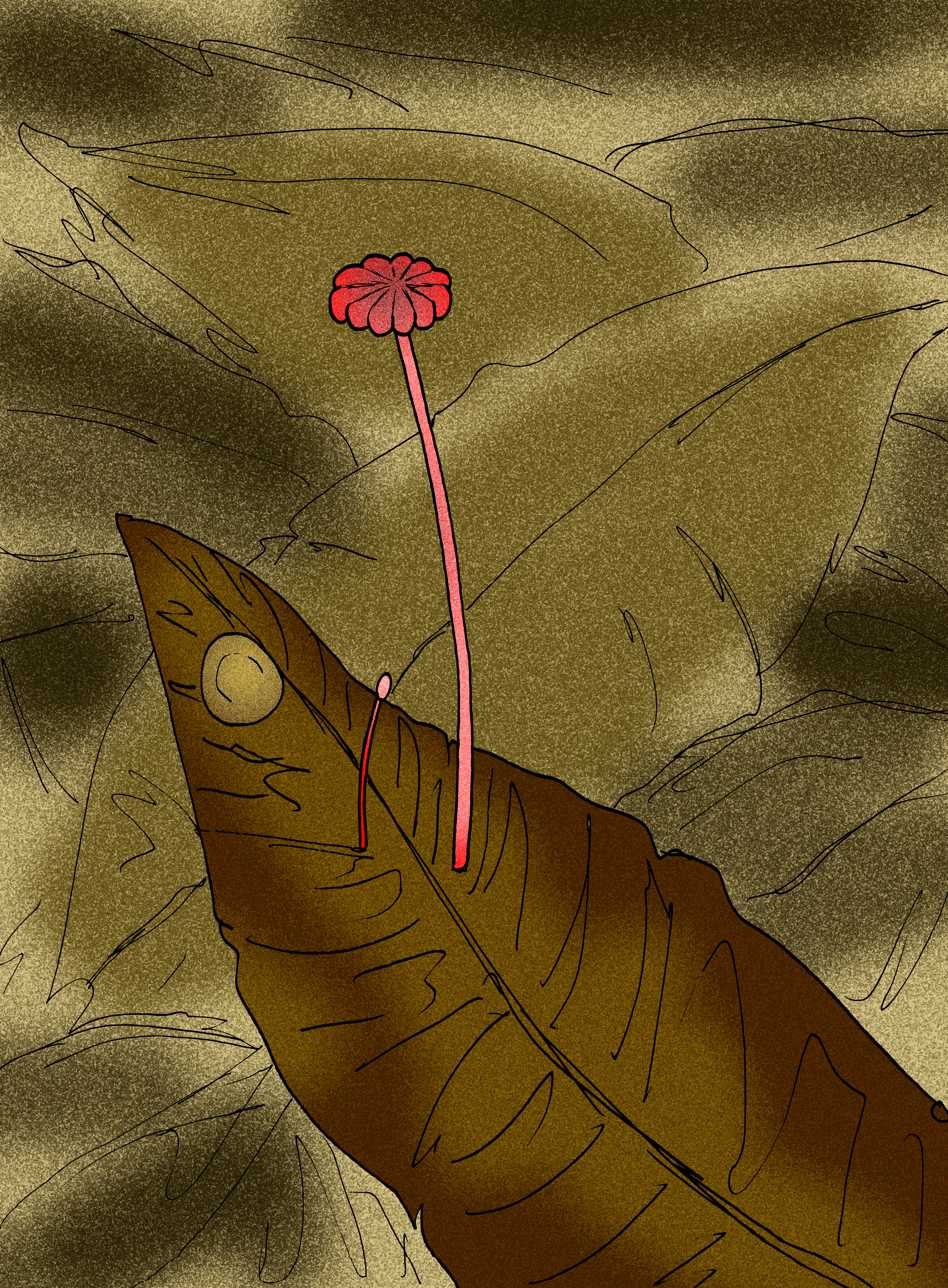
- Artist's reconstruction

Scientific classification
- Domain: Eukaryota
- Kingdom: Fungi
- Division: Basidiomycota
- Class: Agaricomycetes
- Order: Agaricales
- Family: Tricholomataceae
- Genus: †Archaeomarasmius; Hibbett, Grimaldi & Donoghue
- Species: †A. leggetti

Binomial name
- †Archaeomarasmius leggetti Hibbett, Grimaldi & Donoghue

= Archaeomarasmius =

Archaeomarasmius Temporal range: Turonian

Extinct genus of fungi

Archaeomarasmius is an extinct genus of gilled fungus in the Agaricales family Tricholomataceae, containing the single species Archaeomarasmius leggetti. It is known from two fruit bodies recovered from amber, one consisting of a complete cap with a broken stem, the other consisting of a fragment of a cap. The cap has a diameter ranging from 3.2 to 6 mm (0.13 to 0.24 in), while the stem is 0.5 mm (0.02 in) thick. Spores were also recovered from the amber, and are broadly ellipsoid to egg-shaped, measuring roughly 7.3 by 4.7 μm. The species, which resembles the extant genera Marasmius and Marasmiellus, is inferred to have been saprobic on plant litter or other forest debris.

The genus is solely known from the New Jersey amber deposits along the Atlantic coastal plain in New Jersey, United States, which date from the Turonian stage (about 90–94 Mya) of the Upper Cretaceous. Archaeomarasmius is one of only five known agaric fungus species known in the fossil record, and the only one to be described from New Jersey amber.

== History and classification ==
The genus is known only from the two holotype fossils, a fruit body (or mushroom) and a fragment of a mushroom, both currently residing in the American Museum of Natural History. The specimens, collected in November 1994 from the area of East Brunswick, New Jersey, by G.R. Case, P.D. Borodin, and J.J. Leggett, were found as a single clear yellow amber nodule 6 cm (2.4 in) in diameter. The specimen was found above the South Amboy Fire Clay, part of the Raritan Formation, suggesting that it is Turonian in age (Upper Cretaceous, about 90 to 94 million years ago). Due to weathering, the amber specimen AMNH NJ-90 fractured into a number of chips along fractures and flow lines. The chips with the holotype specimens, AMNH NJ-90Y and AMNH NJ-90Z, were first studied by a group of researchers consisting of David Hibbett and Michael Donoghue from Harvard University with David Grimaldi of the AMNH. Hibbett and colleagues published their 1997 type description in the American Journal of Botany. The generic epithet Archaeomarasmius is a combination of the Greek archaeo- meaning "ancient" and "Marasmius", a modern genus which it resembles. The specific epithet "leggetti" was coined by the authors in honor of J.J. Leggett and company, who first discovered the amber nodule and donated it to the AMNH.

When first reported, Archaeomarasmius leggetti was the second extinct species of agaric fungus to be described, and it is the only species to be known from the New Jersey amber. Three species, Aureofungus yaniguaensis, Coprinites dominicana and Protomycena electra, have been described from the Miocene Dominican amber found in the Dominican Republic. The extinct Agaricomycetes species Quatsinoporites cranhamii, found in marine calcareous concretions on Vancouver Island, Canada, and dating to about 130–125 Mya, is probably in the Hymenochaetales or the Polyporales. In 2007, another agaric was reported, Palaeoagaracites antiquus, found in Early Cretaceous Burmese amber (about 100 Mya).

== Description ==
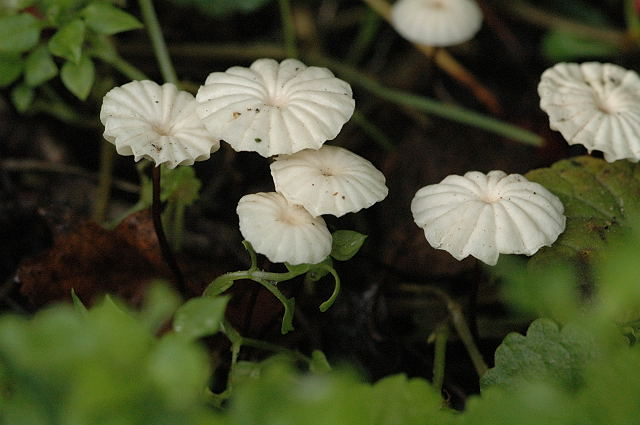
Marasmius rotula (above) and Marasmiellus ramealis (below) are modern species that resemble Archaeomarasmius.

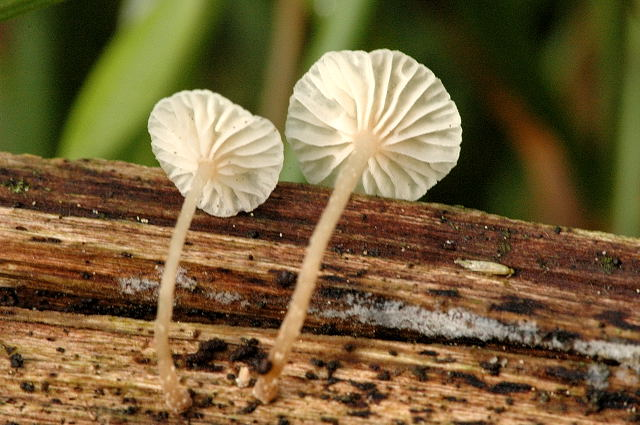

The holotypes of Archaeomarasmius consist of mushrooms and associated basidiospores. Specimen AMNH NJ-90Y is a nearly complete mushroom, broken off near the base of the stipe (stem). The pileus (cap) is up to 6 mm (0.24 in) in diameter and has a convex shape sporting an umbo (a broad raised central region). The mushroom is a medium-dark brown color with thin, minutely textured flesh and an incurved margin. The lamellae or gills are distantly spaced, with 12 gills extending fully from the cap edge to the stipe, and lack lamellulae (short gills which do not reach the stipe from the edge of the pileus). The pileus is centered on the stipe, which is 0.5 by 2.2 mm (0.020 by 0.087 in) long and is broken off above the base. The stipe lacks a veil and is smooth and cylindrical. The top of the pileus is exposed on a fracture plain, and to prevent oxidation, the area was coated in a fine layer of synthetic resin, which also resulted in slightly improved visibility of the mushroom.

Specimen AMNH NJ-90Z is a small wedge-shaped fragment of pileus which was accidentally fractured during preparation for study, splitting it in half. Though the researchers had not intended to perform destructive analysis on the sample, this fracturing warranted the sacrifice of some parts of the specimen for structural and molecular study. Small pieces of the specimen were mounted directly on scanning electron microscopy (SEM) stubs and sputter coated with a gold/palladium alloy. The resulting images showed that little intact tissue remained, and only fragmented and crushed basidiospores were seen. Another sample of the specimen was mounted in spurr's resin (an embedding medium used in electron microscopy) and sectioned with a diamond knife; the resulting sections were examined with transmission electron microscopy (TEM). The lack of discernible biological material from the mushroom seen in the SEM study was confirmed in the TEM analysis. A final section of the fossil was selected to attempt DNA sequencing. A small sample of the fossil was extracted at the AMNH and sent to the Peabody Museum of Archaeology and Ethnology for DNA amplification. None of the three selected extracts showed any results after the amplification was attempted. It is possible that the fractures and flowlines which split AMNH NJ-90Z during initial preparation had already penetrated into the fossil and destroyed the hermetic seal which would have been needed for preserving the organic matter of the mushroom.

The basidiospores recovered with the fruiting body were examined during the SEM study. The spores showed considerable damage from both the fossilization process and the subsequent weathering and specimen collection. They also displayed distinct halos in the amber, possibly from gas or liquid leaching out, or a reaction in the spores that prevented the resin from turning to amber. Even so, enough remained to make some observations about spore morphology. The basidiospores are broadly elliptic to oval, measuring approximately 7.3 by 4.7 μm, and each shows a distinct hilar appendage.

The combined characters of Archaeomarasmius indicate a relation to the modern family Tricholomataceae, with a close similarity to the genera Marasmius and Marasmiellus. Both genera are noted for marcescence, toughening and drying, rather than putrifying. This property would increase the chances of a mushroom becoming entombed in amber. However, a number of other species are also possible close relatives of Archaeomarasmius, mostly in Tricholomataceae, although some species in the family Strophariaceae are also marasmioid. The authors suggest it may also be appropriate to classify Archaeomarasmius more conservatively as incertae sedis (of uncertain placement) within the Tricholomatoceae, Agaricales, or Homobasidiomycetes.

== Associated inclusions ==
The amber specimen "AMNH NJ-90", which preserved the two holotypes, also preserved a number of other inclusions that give indications as to what the ecology of Archaeomarasmius may have been. Of the approximately forty insect inclusions present, flies in the families Ceratopogonidae and Chironomidae, together with caddisflies of the order Trichoptera, suggest that the mushroom was growing near fresh water. Beetles from the family Elateridae, a termite and a pseudoscorpion, in addition to the mushroom, are indicators of rotting wood, probably from a tree in the family Cupressaceae. Modern Marasmiaceae members are saprobic—obtaining nutrients by breaking down organic matter—and specimens included with Archaeomarasmius indicate a similar habit for the mushroom.

== See also ==
- List of Tricholomataceae genera
