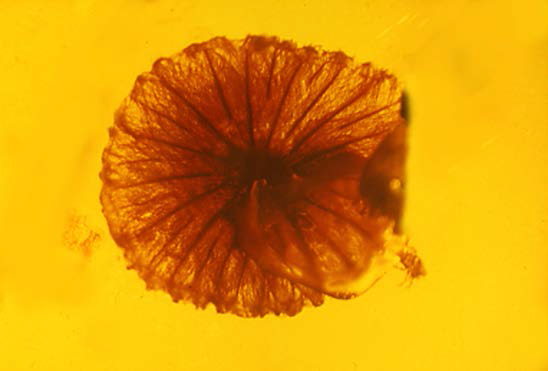

Scientific classification
- Domain: Eukaryota
- Kingdom: Fungi
- Division: Basidiomycota
- Class: Agaricomycetes
- Order: Agaricales
- Family: Agaricaceae
- Genus: †Coprinites; Poinar & Singer, 1990
- Species: †C. dominicana

Binomial name
- †Coprinites dominicana Poinar & Singer, 1990

= Coprinites =

Coprinites Temporal range: Burdigalian

Extinct genus of fungi

Coprinites is an extinct monotypic genus of gilled fungus in the Agaricales family Agaricaceae. At present it contains the single species Coprinites dominicana.

The genus is solely known from the early Miocene, Burdigalian stage, Dominican amber deposits on the island of Hispaniola. Coprinites is one of only four known agarics fungus species known in the fossil record and the first of three to be described from Dominican amber.

== History and classification ==
The genus is known only from the single holotype "AF-9-11", a single fruiting body, mushroom, specimen currently residing in the Poinar collections maintained by the University of California, Berkeley. The specimen was collected from the La Toca amber mine, northeast of Santiago de los Caballeros, in the Cordillera Septentrional area of the Dominican Republic. It was first studied by Dr. George Poinar of the UC, Berkeley and Dr. Rolf Singer from the Field Museum of Natural History in Chicago, Illinois. Poinar and Singer published their 1990 type description in the journal Science. The generic epithet Coprinites is in reference to the genus similarity to the modern genus Coprinus. The specific epithet "dominicana" was coined by the authors in reference to the Dominican Republic where the fossil was recovered.

When initially published Coprinites dominicana was the first species of agaric fungus to be described. Two more species Protomycena electra and Aureofungus yaniguaensis have since been described from fossils found in the amber mines of the Dominican Republic, while the fourth species Archaeomarasmius leggeti is from older Cretaceous age New Jersey Amber. With the 2007 publication of a fifth extinct agaric species, Palaeoagaracites antiquus the age for the order was pushed back to the Albian (approximately 100 Ma).

== Description ==
The holotype of Coprinites is a lone fruiting body without any associated structures and a partly disarticulated stipe preserved in a piece of clear yellow amber approximately 9–6 millimetres (0.35–0.24 in) and weight 0.5 grams (0.018 oz). The pileus is 3.5 millimetres (0.14 in) in diameter and has a convex shape sporting a small central depression. The brownish-pink flesh is thin with a scaly-pectinate surface. The margin is striated and slightly flared. Coprinites sports fifteen nondeccurent lamellae, or gills, which reach the outer pileus and thirteen lamellulae, short gills which do not reach the edge, of varying lengths. The pileus is centered on the stipe, which is 4 millimetres (0.16 in) in diameter and incomplete, with part of the stipe base preserved in the amber next to the pileus. The light brown basidiospores, present on the hymenium associated with the fruiting body, are smooth and ellipsoidal to oblong. Each basidiospore is approximately 6 to 7 μm long and appear to possess a germ pore.

Coprinites was originally placed in the family Coprinaceae based on the visible structures, or macromorphology of the fruiting body and the microscopic features preserved in the amber specimen. The combination of characters present did not match any modern genus of the mushroom order Agaricales leading Poinar and Singer to erect the genus Coprinites. The lack of autodeliquescence along with the mushrooms morphology lead David Hibbett, Michael Donoghue and David Grimaldi to question the placement of Coprinites. They noted the characters of the genus are similar to those of genus Leucocoprinus mushrooms. They suggested that Coprinites could be treated as either a member of Coprinaceae or Agaricaceae, to which Leucocoprinus belongs. With a number of molecular studies a large portion of the genera formerly placed in Coprinaceae, including Coprinus, have been moved into Agaricaceae. Thus supporting the suggestion of Hibbet, Donoghue, and Grimaldi.
