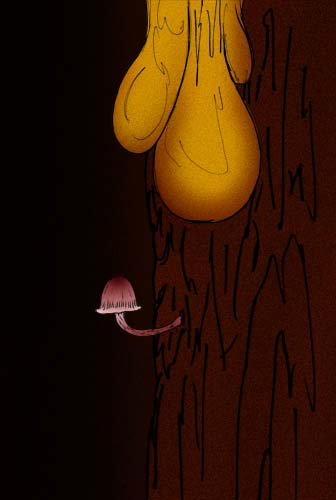
- Artist's reconstruction

Scientific classification
- Kingdom: Fungi
- Division: Basidiomycota
- Class: Agaricomycetes
- Order: Agaricales
- Family: Mycenaceae
- Genus: †Protomycena; Hibbett, Grimaldi & Donoghue
- Species: †P. electra

Binomial name
- †Protomycena electra Hibbett, Grimaldi & Donoghue
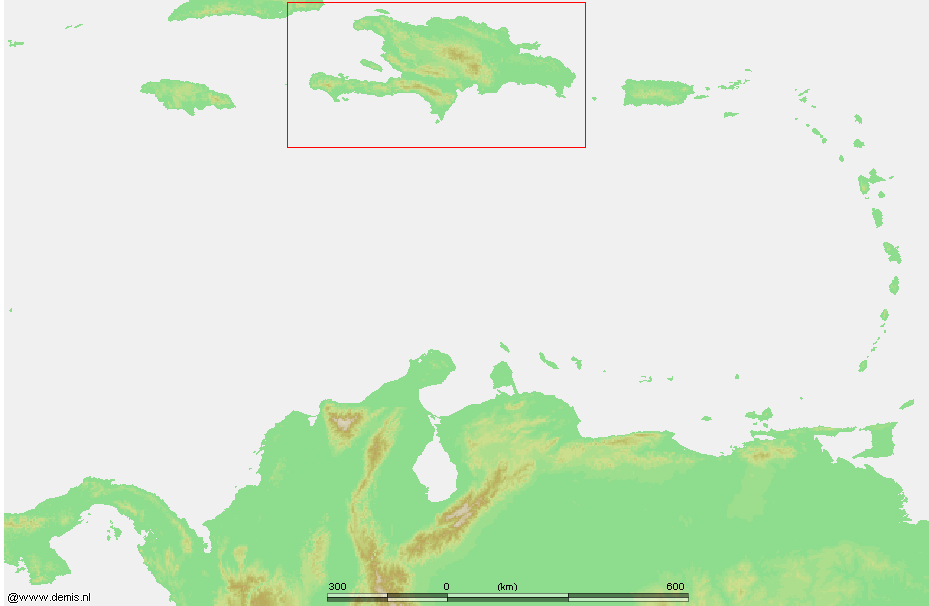
- Protomycena is known only from amber deposits on the island of Hispaniola, north of South America

= Protomycena =

Protomycena Temporal range: Burdigalian

Extinct genus of fungi

Protomycena is an extinct monotypic genus of gilled fungus in the family Mycenaceae, of order Agaricales. At present it contains the single species Protomycena electra, known from a single specimen collected in an amber mine in the Cordillera Septentrional area of the Dominican Republic. The fruit body of the fungus has a convex cap that is 5 mm (0.2 in) in diameter, with distantly spaced gills on the underside. The curved stipe is smooth and cylindrical, measuring 0.75 mm (0.030 in) thick by 10 mm (0.39 in) long, and lacks a ring. It resembles extant (currently living) species of the genus Mycena. Protomycena is one of only five known agaric fungus species known in the fossil record and the second to be described from Dominican amber.

== Discovery and classification ==
The genus is known only from the holotype specimen, a single fruit body (mushroom) currently residing in the private collection owned by Ettore Morone of Turin, Italy. The specimen was collected in one of the amber mines in the Cordillera Septentrional area of the island of Hispaniola, in the Dominican Republic. The amber is believed to date from the Miocene Burdigalian stage, about 20 to 16 million years before the present. It was first studied by a group of researchers consisting of David Hibbett and Michael Donoghue from Harvard University, with David Grimaldi of the American Museum of Natural History. Hibbett and colleagues published their 1997 type description in the American Journal of Botany. The generic name Protomycena is noted as "first", and "Mycena", a modern genus that it resembles. The specific epithet electra was coined by the authors from the Latin or Greek word for "amber", in reference to the mode of preservation.

When it was reported, Protomycena electra was the third species of fossil agaric fungus to be described. The two species Coprinites dominicana and Aureofungus yaniguaensis are also known from the amber mines of the Dominican Republic, while the fourth species Archaeomarasmius leggeti is from the older, Cretaceous age New Jersey Amber. With the 2007 publication of a fifth extinct agaric species, Palaeoagaracites antiquus, the minimum age for the order Agaricales was pushed back to the Albian (approximately 100 Ma).

== Description ==
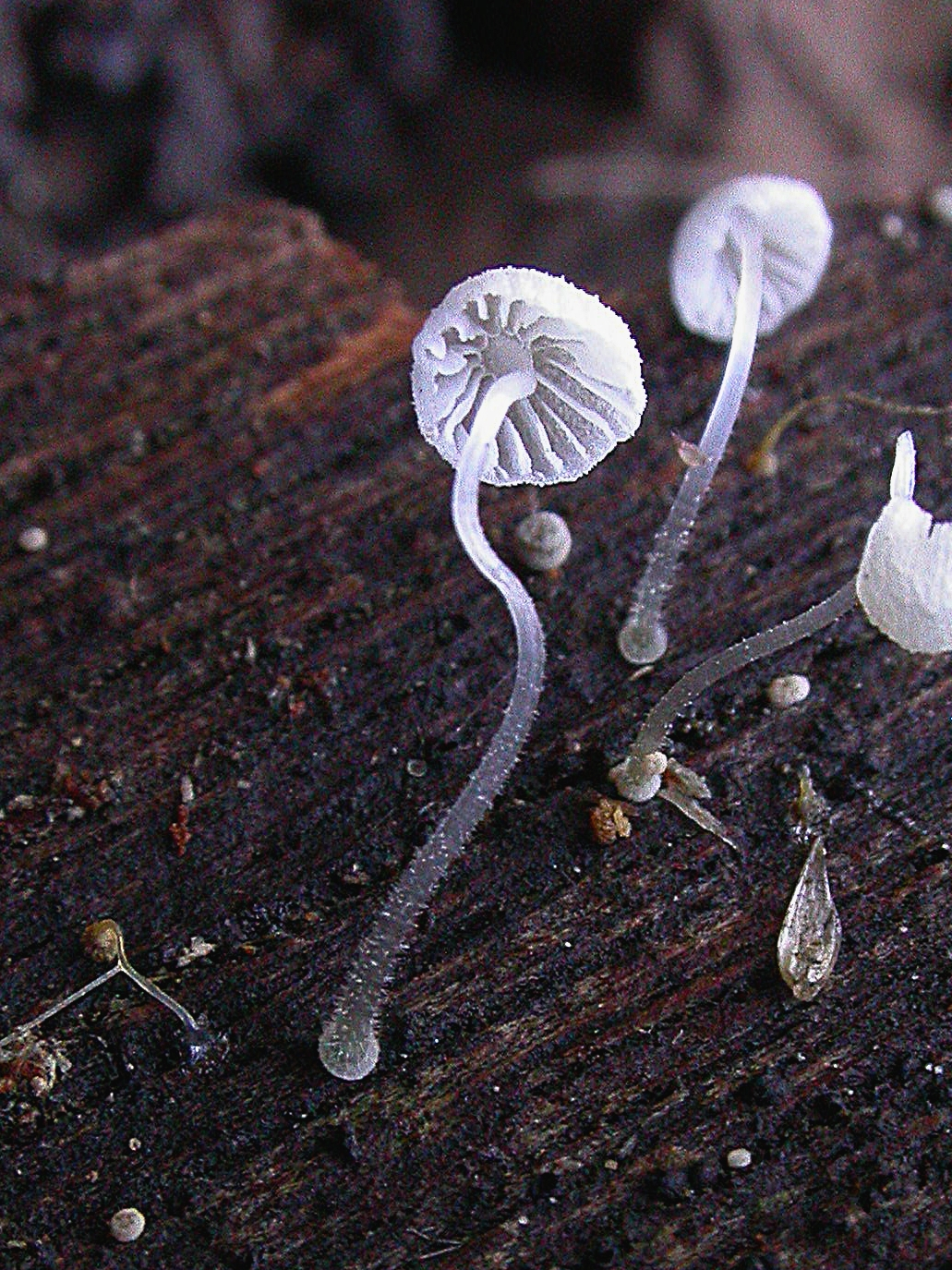
Protomycena is similar in appearance to modern Mycena species, such as M. adscendens shown here.

The holotype of Protomycena is a single fruit body without any associated structures, preserved in a piece of clear light yellow polished amber approximately 4.5–2.5 cm (1.77–0.98 in) wide. The pileus is 5 mm (0.2 in) in diameter and has a convex shape, sporting a raised central region (an umbo). The pale flesh appears yellowish in the amber, and is smooth and glossy, changing to striate and slightly translucent towards the margin. The pileus margin is striated and slightly flared. The gills on the underside of the pileus are broadly attached (adnate) to the top of the stipe, and distantly spaced—between six and eight gills extend completely from the pileus margin to the stipe. These full-length gills are anastomosed with lamellulae (short gills which do not reach the edge of the stipe from the pileus margin) of varying lengths. The pileus is centered on the curved stipe, which is smooth and cylindrical, measuring 0.75 mm (0.030 in) thick by 10 mm (0.39 in) long. The stipe lacks a ring and rhizoids. The mushroom is preserved with a small liquid and gas-filled bubble, possibly originating from the mushroom itself, which indicates the amber to be very solid and well-sealed.

In Hibbett and colleagues' 1997 publication, Protomycena was placed in the subfamily Myceneae, which at the time was considered part of the family Tricholomataceae; Mycena is currently classified in the family Mycenaceae. The placement was based solely on the visible structures, or macromorphology of the fruit body. Many of the features which are typically used to classify species into fungal families and subfamilies are based on microscopic features not visible or preserved in the amber specimen. Consequently, the assignment to Mycena is provisional (the authors also note certain similarities with extant members of Marasmius), and the describing authors leave open the option of treating the genus placement as incertae sedis (uncertain placement) within the Agaricales. Protomycena is distinct from other amber-preserved mushroom taxa such as Coprinites, in the grooved surface of its pileus and its anastomosing gills.
