= Aureofungus =

Aureofungus Temporal range: Burdigalian

Scientific classification
- Domain: Eukaryota
- Kingdom: Fungi
- Division: Basidiomycota
- Class: Agaricomycetes
- Order: Agaricales
- Family: incertae sedis
- Genus: †Aureofungus; Hibbett et al.
- Species: †A. yaniguaensis

Binomial name
- †Aureofungus yaniguaensis Hibbett et al.

Extinct genus of fungi

Aureofungus is an extinct monotypic genus of gilled fungus in the order Agaricales. At present it contains the single species Aureofungus yaniguaensis.

The genus is solely known from the early Miocene, Burdigalian stage, Dominican amber deposits on the island of Hispaniola. Aureofungus is one of only four known agarics fungus species known in the fossil record and the third to be described from Dominican amber.

== History and classification ==
The genus is known only from the holotype fossil, which is a single fruiting body currently residing in the private collection owned by Yale Goldman of Connecticut United States. The specimen was collected in August 2000 from the Yanigua Mine, El Valle in the eastern Dominican Republic. It was first studied by a group of researchers led by Dr. David Hibbett of the Clark University. Hibbett et al published their 2003 type description in the journal Mycologia. The generic epithet Aureofungus is Latin in derivation and means "golden fungus" while the specific epithet "yaniguaensis" was coined by the authors from "Yanigua" in recognition of the type locality.

When described Aureofungus yaniguaensis was the fourth species of fossil agaric fungus to be described. Two species Coprinites dominicana and Protomycena electra are also from the amber mines of the Dominican Republic, while the third species Archaeomarasmius leggeti is from the older Cretaceous age New Jersey Amber. With the 2007 publication of a fifth extinct agaric species, Palaeoagaracites antiquus the age for the order was pushed back to the Albian (approximately 100 Ma).

== Description ==
The holotype of Aureofungus is a fruiting body and associated basidiospores. The pileus is 3 millimetres (0.12 in) in diameter and has a convex shape sporting a broad raised central region. The lightly textured flesh is yellow-brown in coloration and sports a striated, incurved margin. The lamellae or gills are subdistant and lacking lamellulae, short gills which do not reach the edge of the pileus. The pileus is centered on the stipe, which is 0.8 by 7 millimetres (0.031 by 0.276 in) long and lacking the volva, annulus and any rhizoids. The basidiospores associated with the fruiting body are grouped in masses and appear to have been produced by the fruiting body after entombment in the resin. Each basidiospore is broadly elliptic and approximately 4.0μm by 3.3μm.

These combined characters indicate a possible relation to the modern Tricholomataceae or some of the "dusky-spored taxa" such as Coprinellus disseminatus. However the thickness of the amber entombing the specimen prevented study finer details, such as spore ornamentation and pileus texture, which would have clarified the relations. As such Hibbett et al left the placement of Aureofungus as Agaricales incertae sedis. Despite the lack of visible details, enough characters are present to distinguish Aureofungus from the three other known amber fossil species.

== See also ==
- List of Agaricales genera
