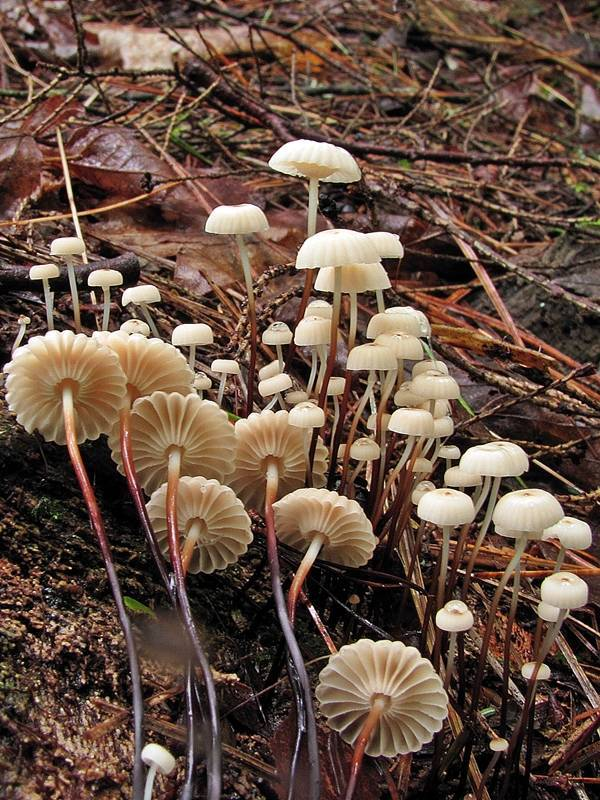

Scientific classification
- Kingdom: Fungi
- Division: Basidiomycota
- Class: Agaricomycetes
- Order: Agaricales
- Family: Marasmiaceae
- Genus: Marasmius
- Species: M. rotula

Binomial name
- Marasmius rotula (Scop.) Fr. (1838)

Synonyms
- Agaricus rotula Scop. (1772); Merulius collariatus With. (1796); Micromphale collariatum (With.) Gray (1821); Androsaceus rotula (Scop.) Pat. (1887); Chamaeceras rotula (Scop.) Kuntze (1898)

= Marasmius rotula =

Species of fungus

Marasmius rotula Mycological characteristics
- Gills on hymenium
- Cap is convex
- Hymenium is free
- Stipe is bare
- Spore print is white
- Ecology is saprotrophic
- Edibility is inedible

Marasmius rotula is a common species of agaric fungus in the family Marasmiaceae. Widespread in the Northern Hemisphere, it is commonly known variously as the pinwheel mushroom, the pinwheel marasmius, the little wheel, the collared parachute, or the horse hair fungus. The type species of the genus Marasmius, M. rotula was first described scientifically in 1772 by mycologist Giovanni Antonio Scopoli and assigned its current name in 1838 by Elias Fries.

The fruit bodies, or mushrooms, of M. rotula are characterized by their whitish, thin, and membranous caps up to 2 cm (3/4 in) wide that are sunken in the center, and pleated with scalloped margins. The slender and wiry black hollow stems measure up to 8 cm (3 in) long by 1.5 mm (1/16 in) thick. On the underside of the caps are widely spaced white gills that are attached to a collar encircling the stem. The mushrooms grow in groups or clusters on decaying wood such as fallen twigs and sticks, moss-covered logs, and stumps.

Although many mushrooms release their spores in response to a circadian rhythm, spore release in M. rotula is dependent upon sufficient moisture. Dried mushrooms may revive after rehydrating and continue to release spores for up to three weeks—a sustained spore production of markedly longer duration than other typical agarics. There are several species of Marasmius with which M. rotula might be confused due to somewhat similar overall appearances, but differences in size, gill arrangement, and substrate are usually sufficient field characteristics to distinguish them. M. rotula mushrooms are not generally considered edible. They produce a unique peroxidase enzyme that is attracting research interest for possible use in bioengineering applications.

== Taxonomy ==
The species was first described by Italian mycologist Giovanni Antonio Scopoli as Agaricus rotula in 1772. In 1821 Elias Magnus Fries redescribed the mushroom in Systema Mycologicum, and later transferred it to Marasmius in his 1838 Epicrisis Systematis Mycologici. Synonyms include names derived from generic transfers to Androsaceus by Narcisse Théophile Patouillard in 1887, and to Chamaeceras by Otto Kuntze in 1898; both of these genera are now obsolete and have since been sunk back into Marasmius.

In his 1821 A Natural Arrangement of British Plants, Samuel Frederick Gray introduced the generic name Micromphale, including the species Micromphale collariatum, which was based on William Withering's 1796 Merulius collariatus. In 1946 Alexander H. Smith and Rolf Singer proposed to conserve the name Marasmius over Micromphale; the latter had nomenclatorial priority as it was published first. The generic name Marasmius, with M. rotula as the lectotype species, was later conserved at the 1954 Paris Congress on Botanical Nomenclature. M. rotula is also the type species of section Marasmius within the genus. This grouping of species is characterized by inamyloid flesh, a cap cuticle with broom cells (finger-like projections common to Marasmius species) ornamented with numerous warts, gills usually attached to a collar surrounding the stem, and the presence of black rhizomorphs on the stem.

Several varieties of M. rotula have been described. Miles Berkeley and Moses Ashley Curtis named var. fuscus in 1869 for its brown cap. In 1887 Pier Andrea Saccardo described var. microcephalus from Italy, with caps half the normal size. It is now understood that fruit body morphology is variable and dependent upon environmental conditions. Joseph Schröter described var. phyllophyla in 1889, but that taxon is now treated as Marasmius bulliardii.

Marasmius rotula is commonly known as the "pinwheel mushroom", the "pinwheel Marasmius", the "collared parachute", or the "horse hair fungus". This latter name is shared with other Marasmius species, including M. androsaceus and M. crinis-equi. Gray called it the "collared dimple-stool". The name "little wheel fungus" is suggestive of the collar to which the gills are attached like the spokes of a wheel, like the specific epithet, which is a diminutive of rota, the Latin word for "wheel".

== Description ==
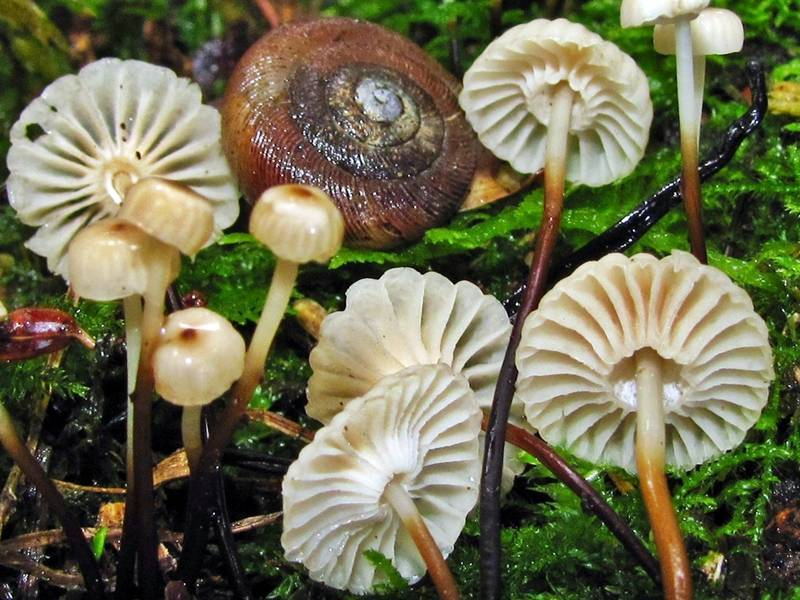
The gills are attached to a collar encircling the stem.

The cap of the fruit body is thin and membranous, measuring 3 to 20 mm (1/8 to 3/4 in) in diameter. It has a convex shape slightly depressed in the center, conspicuous furrows in an outline of the gills, and scalloped edges. Young, unexpanded caps are yellowish brown; as the cap expands, the color lightens to whitish or light pinkish-white, often with a darker, sometimes brown center. The variety fusca has brown caps. The white or slightly yellowish flesh is very thin, reaching about 0.25–1.5 mm thick in the central part of the cap, and even thinner at the margin.

Gills are attached to a collar, never to the stem, although some specimens have the collar pressed close enough to it that this characteristic may be less obvious. Widely spaced, they have the same whitish to pale yellow color as the flesh, and typically number between 16 and 22. They are initially narrow, but thicken downward to about 1–3 mm at the exposed edge. The stem is 1.2 to 8 cm (1/2 to 3 in) long and up to 0.15 cm (0.06 in) thick, with a smooth, sometimes shiny surface. It is tough, hollow, and either straight or with some curving. The color is blackish-brown up to a lighter, almost translucent apex. The base of the stem may be connected to dark brown or black root-like rhizomorphs 0.1–0.3 mm thick. Mature specimens display no veil.

Note particularly the manner in which the hair-like stem is set into the tiny socket, the sparsity of the gill development, and the fine furrows and scallopings of the margin of the cap. A Swiss watchmaker could not excel such workmanship.

— Louis C.C. Krieger

Details of the fruit bodies' appearance, color in particular, are somewhat variable and dependent on growing conditions. For example, specimens growing on logs in oak and hickory forests in the spring tend to have more yellowish-white, depressed caps than those found in the same location in autumn, which are light yellow brown and more convex in shape. The fruit body development of M. rotula is hemiangiocarpous, with an hymenium that is only partially enclosed by basidiocarp tissues. Robert Kühner showed that a cortina-like tissue covers the young gills before the expanding cap breaks away from the stem. In unfavorable weather conditions, the mushrooms may fail to develop normally and instead produce semi-gasteroid basidiocarps.

=== Microscopic characteristics ===
Viewed in deposit, such as with a spore print, the spores of Marasmius rotula appear white or pale yellow. Under an optical microscope, they are hyaline (translucent), teardrop- or pip-shaped, and have dimensions of 7–10 by 3–5 μm. The basidia (spore-producing cells) are four-spored, club-shaped or nearly so, and 21–21 by 4–17 μm. Along the edge of the gill, interspersed among the basidia, are non-reproductive cells, the cheilocystidia; these are club-shaped with rough wart-like protuberances on the surface. The gill edges further feature broom cells, which are variably shaped, thin-walled, and measure 7–32 by 2.5–20 μm. Their apical surfaces are covered with yellowish, blunt, and conical warts or incrustations 0.2–1.5 by 0.1–1 μm.

== Similar species ==
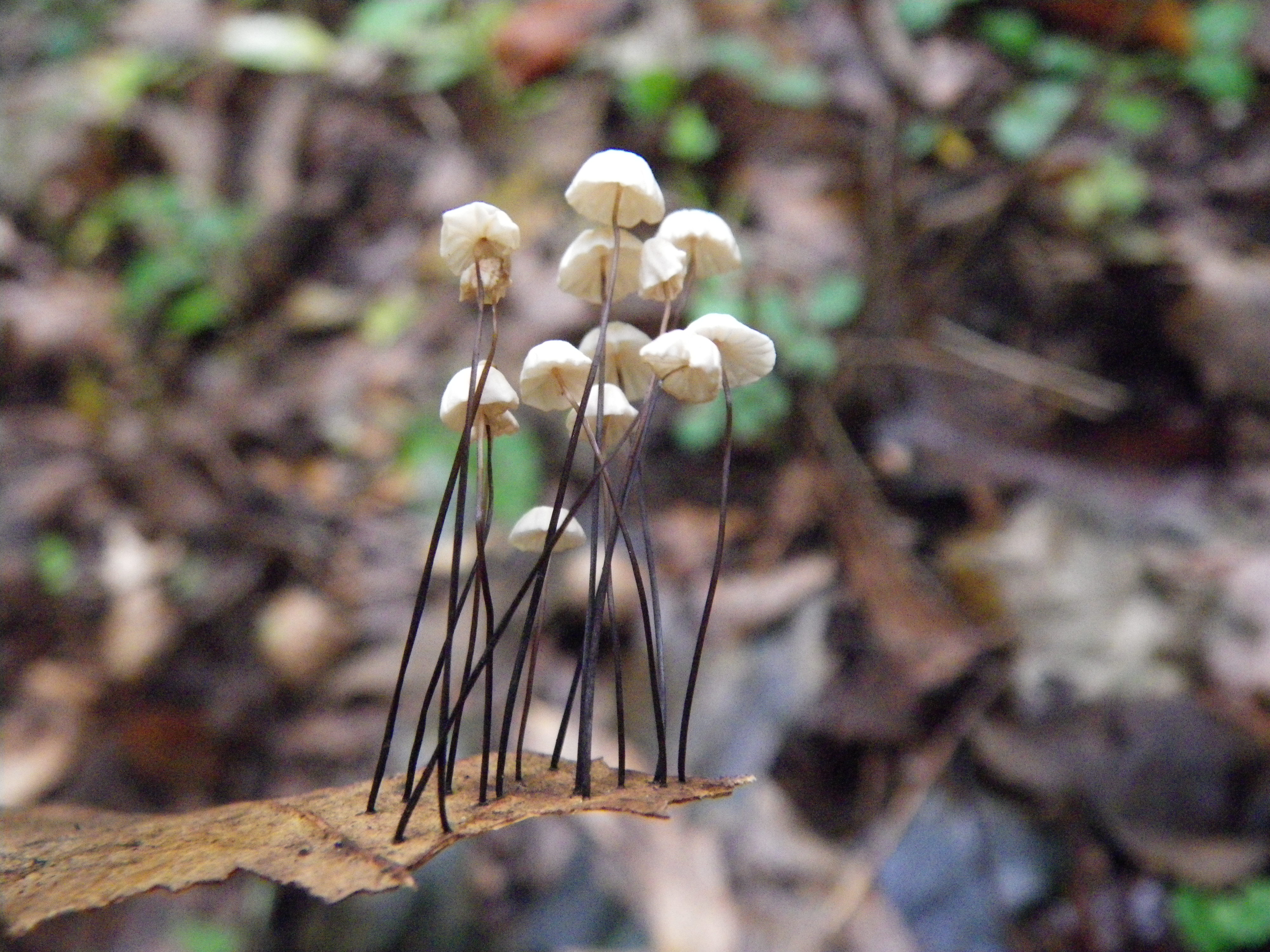
Marasmius capillaris grows on oak leaves.

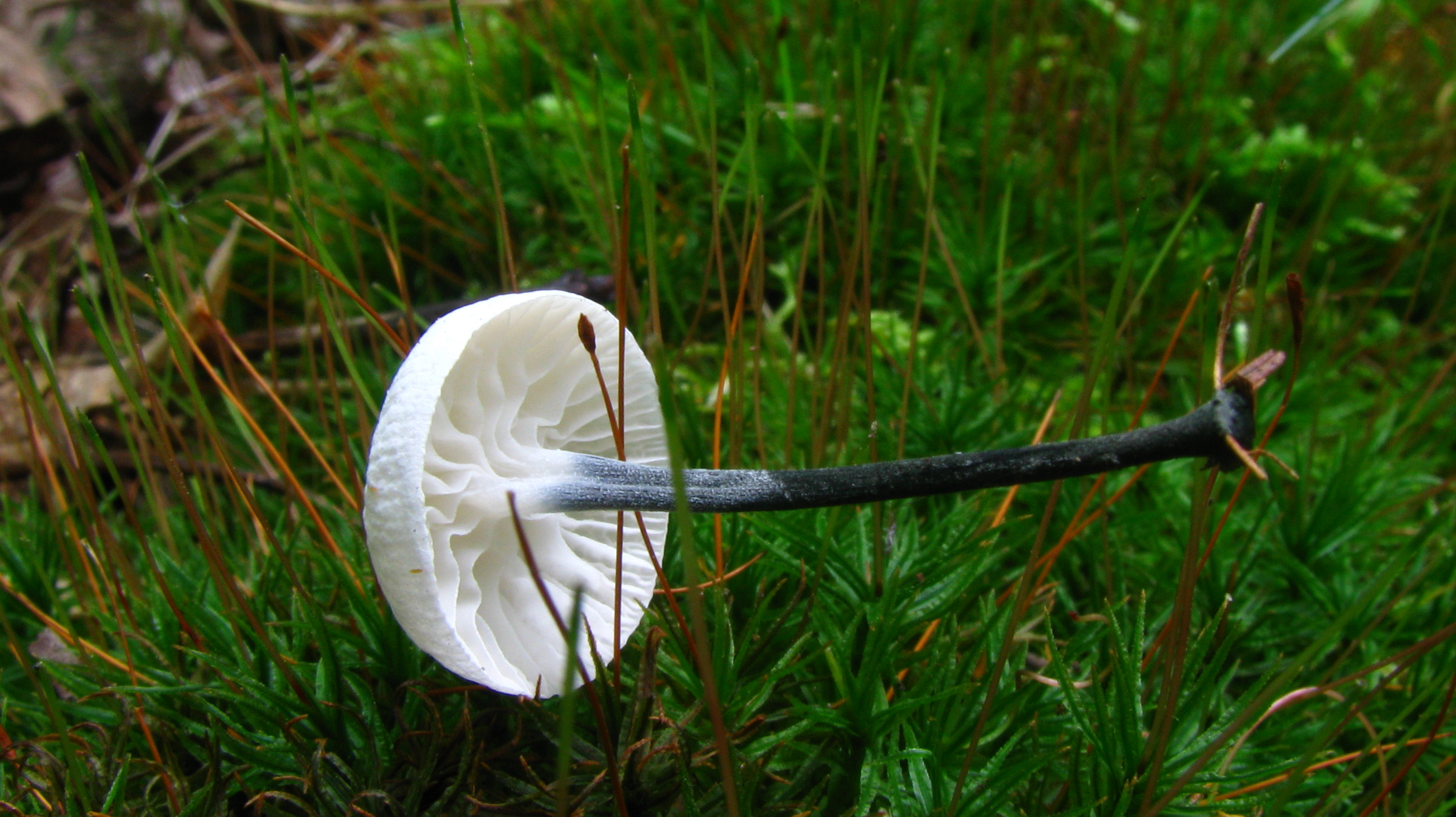
The stem of Tetrapyrgos nigripes appears to have a powdery bloom.

There are several less-common species of Marasmius with which M. rotula might be confused due to somewhat similar overall appearances, but differences in size, gill arrangement, and substrate are usually sufficient field characteristics to distinguish between them. For example, Marasmius capillaris has a pale tan cap with a white center, and grows on oak leaves without forming clusters. Furthermore, its cap is evenly rounded, unlike the pleated and furrowed cap of M. rotula, and its stem is somewhat thinner (usually less than 0.3 mm) and slightly darker in color.

M. rotula is distinguished from M. bulliardii by its larger size, and greater number of gills. M. limosus is found in marshes, where it fruits on the dead stems of reeds and rushes. Tetrapyrgos nigripes (formerly treated in Marasmius) has white caps that are 5 to 10 mm (3/16 to 3/8 in) in diameter, attached gills that are sometimes slightly decurrent, a dark stem covered with tiny white hairs that give it a powdered appearance, and triangular to star-shaped spores. M. neorotula, described from Brazil, was considered by its discoverer Rolf Singer to be closely related to M. rotula. In addition to its tropical distribution, it can be distinguished from M. rotula by its smaller size and more widely spaced gills. M. rotuloides, known only from montane forests of Trinidad, can only be reliably distinguished from M. rotula by microscopic characteristics: it has smaller, ovoid spores measuring 5 by 2.5 μm.

Other Marasmius species with a pinwheel arrangement of gills are readily distinguished from M. rotula by differences in color, including the orange M. siccus, the pink M. pulcherripes, and the rust M. fulvoferrugineus. Mycena corticola is smaller than Marasmius rotula, has a pale pink-brown cap, and is usually found growing singly or in small groups on bark near the base of living trees.

== Habitat and distribution ==
Marasmius rotula grows in deciduous forests and fruits in groups or clusters on dead wood (especially beech), woody debris such as twigs or sticks, and occasionally on rotting leaves. The fruit bodies, which are easily overlooked because of their diminutive size, are often present in abundance after rains.

The fungus is widespread and common in its preferred habitats in North America, Europe, and northern Asia. Although far less common in southerly locations, isolated collections have been reported from Africa (Congo, Nigeria, Sierra Leone, and Tanzania) and South Asia (India). In North America M. rotula is most common in the eastern part of the continent.

== Ecology ==
Marasmius rotula is a saprobic species and as such obtains nutrients by decomposing dead organic matter. The species is relatively intolerant of low water potentials, and will grow poorly or not at all under water stress conditions. It is unable to degrade leaf litter until it becomes more fragmented and more compacted so that the water-holding capacity increases in the deeper layers of the soil. The magnolia warbler has been noted to line its nests with the fruit bodies' stems.

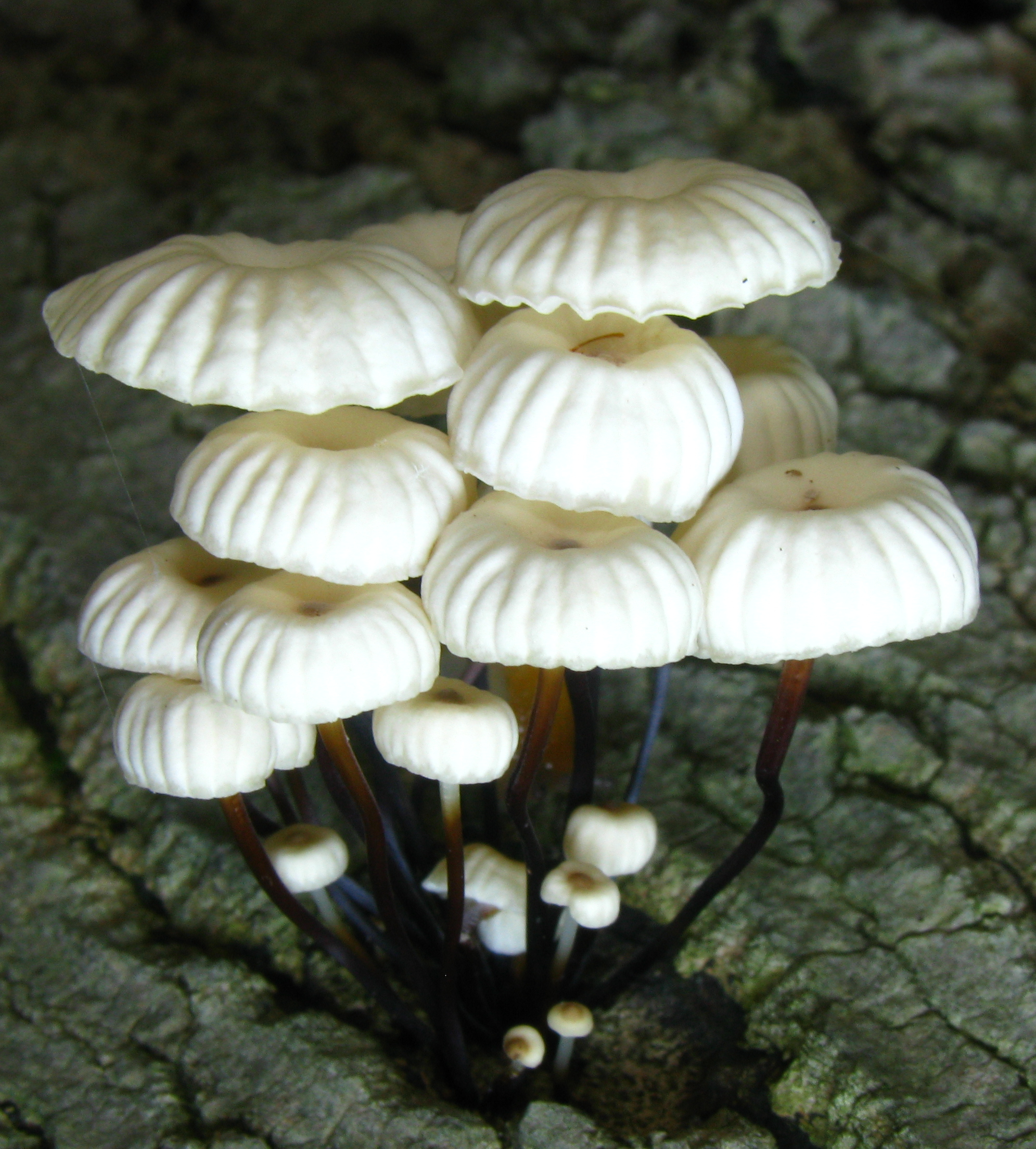
Fruit bodies typically grow in clusters on woody debris.

In 1975 the American mycologist Martina S. Gilliam investigated the periodicity of spore release in M. rotula and concluded that spore discharge did not follow a regular circadian rhythm, as is typical of agaric and bolete mushrooms, but rather was dependent on rain. A threshold of rainfall is required to elicit a spore discharge response and the duration of peak spore discharge correlates with the amount of rainfall, rather than its duration. Furthermore, Gilliam noted that spore prints were more readily obtained if the stem ends were placed in water, suggesting that water must enter through the fruit body for discharge to occur.

Like those of many other species of Marasmius, the fruit bodies of M. rotula can desiccate and shrivel in dry periods, then revive when sufficient moisture is available again in the form of rain or high humidity. Gilliam's study demonstrated that revived fruit bodies were capable of discharging spores over a period of at least three weeks, whereas previous studies using similar methods with other Agaricomycetes showed spore discharge occurred over a shorter period of up to six days after revival. The potential for sustained spore production and discharge may be due to the growth of new basidioles (immature basidia) during periods of growth, which then complete maturation when the mushroom revives. This may also explain why the gills become thicker as the mushroom matures.

== Uses ==
Marasmius rotula is generally considered inedible, but is not poisonous. The mushroom has no distinguishable odor, and its flavor varies from bland to bitter. Louis Krieger, writing in National Geographic in the 1920s, noted that the mushroom was used as an addition to gravies and, when used to garnish venison, "adds the appropriate touch of the wild woodlands". The fruit bodies will bioaccumulate cadmium: a study of the metal concentration of 15 wild mushroom species of India showed that M. rotula accumulated the highest concentration of that metal.

A peroxidase enzyme known as MroAPO (Marasmius rotula aromatic peroxygenase) is attracting research interest for possible applications in biocatalysis. In general, enzymes that catalyze oxygen-transfer reactions are of great utility in chemical synthesis since they work selectively and under ambient conditions. Fungal peroxidases can catalyze oxidations that are difficult for the organic chemist, including those involving aromatic substrates such as aniline, 4-aminophenol, hydroquinone, resorcinol, catechol, and paracetamol. The M. rotula enzyme is the first fungal peroxygenase that can be produced in high yields. It is highly stable over a wide pH range, and in a variety of organic solvents. The enzyme has other potential for use as a biosensor for aromatic substances in environmental analysis and drug monitoring.

== See also ==
- List of Marasmius species
