= Pseudomeliola =

Scientific classification
- Kingdom: Fungi
- Division: Ascomycota
- Class: Sordariomycetes
- Order: Hypocreales
- Family: incertae sedis
- Genus: Pseudomeliola; Speg.

Type species
- Pseudomeliola brasiliensis Speg.

Genus of fungi

Pseudomeliola is a genus of fungi in the Hypocreales order. The relationship of this taxon to other taxa within the order is unknown (incertae sedis), and it has not yet been placed with certainty into any family. Unchanged in 2020.

== Species ==
As accepted by Species Fungorum;

- Pseudomeliola andina Pat. (1893)
- Pseudomeliola brasiliensis Speg. (1889)
- Pseudomeliola ecuadorensis Syd. (1939)
- Pseudomeliola grammodes (Kunze) Arx (1958)
- Pseudomeliola miconiae Gonz. Frag. & Cif. (1928)
- Pseudomeliola placida Syd. & P. Syd. (1911)
- Pseudomeliola rolliniae Rehm (1901)
- Pseudomeliola seleriana Henn. (1894)
- Pseudomeliola styracum (Speg.) Petr. (1936)
- Pseudomeliola uleana Arx (1958)

Former species;

- P. collapsa Earle (1905) = Trichothyrium collapsum, Trichothyriaceae
- P. gardeniae (Keissl.) Petr. (1940) = Hyalodermella gardeniae, Ascomycota
- P. mirabilis (Petr. & Cif.) Petr. & Cif. (1936) = Schweinitziella mirabilis, Trichosphaeriaceae
- P. perpusilla (Speg.) Rehm (1901) = Schweinitziella perpusilla, Trichosphaeriaceae
