= Ticonectria =

Scientific classification
- Kingdom: Fungi
- Division: Ascomycota
- Class: Sordariomycetes
- Order: Hypocreales
- Family: incertae sedis
- Genus: Ticonectria; Döbbeler (1998)

Type species
- Ticonectria perianthii Döbbeler (1988)

Species
- T. perianthii T. testudinea

Genus of fungi

Ticonectria is a fungal genus in the order Hypocreales. The relationship of this taxon to other taxa within the order is unknown (incertae sedis), and it has not yet been placed with certainty into any family.
