= Bulbithecium =

Scientific classification
- Kingdom: Fungi
- Division: Ascomycota
- Class: Sordariomycetes
- Order: Hypocreales
- Family: incertae sedis
- Genus: Bulbithecium; Udagawa & T. Muroi

Type species
- Bulbithecium hyalosporum Udagawa & T. Muroi

Genus of fungi

Bulbithecium is a genus of fungi in the Hypocreales order. The relationship of this taxon to other taxa within the order is unknown (incertae sedis), and it has not yet been placed with certainty into any family. This is a monotypic genus, containing the single species Bulbithecium hyalosporum. The genus and species were published by Udagawa & T. Muroi in Bull. natn. Sci. Mus., Tokyo, B Vol.16 (1) on page 14 in 1990.
