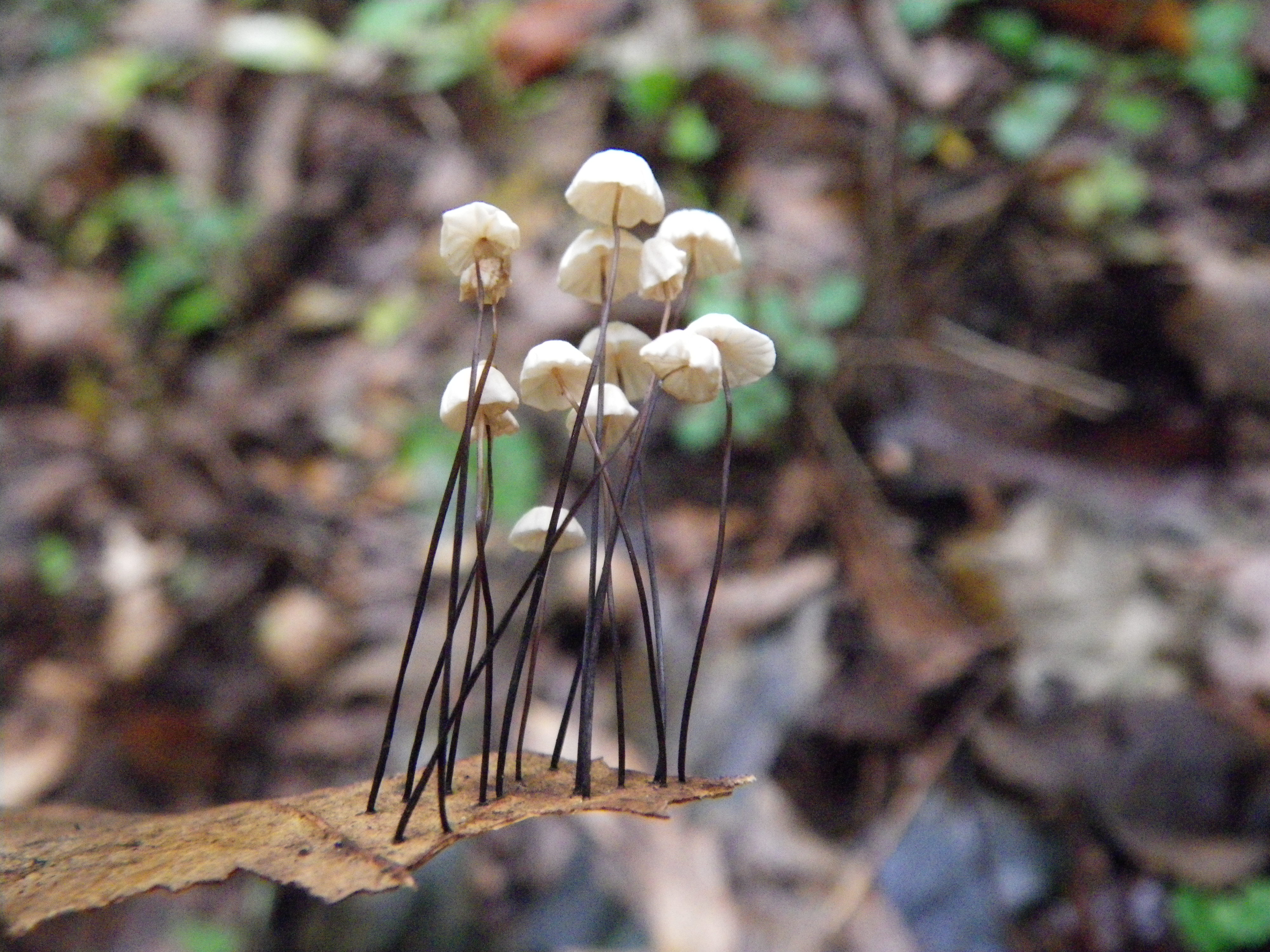

Scientific classification
- Domain: Eukaryota
- Kingdom: Fungi
- Division: Basidiomycota
- Class: Agaricomycetes
- Order: Agaricales
- Family: Marasmiaceae
- Genus: Marasmius
- Species: M. capillaris

Binomial name
- Marasmius capillaris Morgan (1883)

Synonyms
- Chamaeceras capillaris (Morgan) Kuntze (1898)

= Marasmius capillaris =

Species of fungus

Marasmius capillaris is a species of agaric fungus in the family Marasmiaceae. A saprobic fungus, it produces fruit bodies (mushrooms) that grows in groups on decaying oak leaves in North America. The caps on the mushrooms are convex and then centrally depressed with radial furrows, measuring 2–15 mm (0.08–0.6 in) in diameter. The wiry, shiny stems are thin (less than 1 mm thick) and up to 60 mm (2.4 in) long. Its spore print is white, and the spores are smooth and pip-shaped, measuring 7–11 by 3–5 μm. The mushrooms somewhat resemble Marasmius rotula, but are smaller and darker in color.
