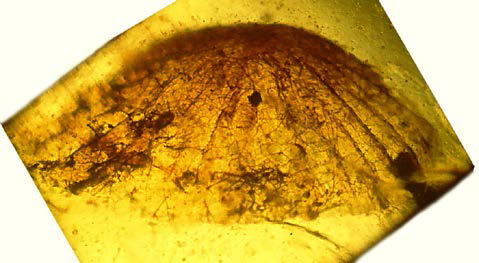
- Palaeoagaricites antiquus cap

Scientific classification
- Kingdom: Fungi
- Division: Basidiomycota
- Class: Agaricomycetes
- Order: Agaricales
- Family: incertae sedis
- Genus: †Palaeoagaracites
- Species: †P. antiquus

Binomial name
- †Palaeoagaracites antiquus Poinar & Buckley 2007

= Palaeoagaracites =

Palaeoagaracites Temporal range: Albian

Extinct genus of fungi

Palaeoagaracites is an extinct monotypic genus of gilled fungus in the order Agaricales. It contains the single species Palaeoagaracites antiquus.

The genus is solely known from the Lower Cretaceous, Upper Albian stage (about 100 Ma), Burmese amber deposits in Myanmar. Palaeoagaracites is one of only five known agaric fungal species known in the fossil record, the second oldest to be described, and only genus from Burmese amber.

== History and classification ==
The genus is known only from the single holotype, number "AB-368", a single partial fruiting body specimen. When described the mushroom was in the private collection of Ron Buckley of Florence, Kentucky, United States. The collection has since been sold and is now owned by Deniz Erin of Istanbul, Turkey. AB-368 was collected from one of the amber mines in the Hukawng Valley area southwest of Maingkhwan, Kachin State, Northern Myanmar. It was first studied by a pair of researchers led by Dr George Poinar from Oregon State University who worked with Ron Buckley. Poinar and Buckley published their 2007 type description in Mycological Research, a journal of the British Mycological Society. The genus has been assigned the MycoBank number MB510456, and the species number MB510465.

The genus name Palaeoagaracites is Greek in derivation and is a combination of the words palaeo meaning "old" and agaricon, which means "fungus". The specific epithet antiquus is Latin for "old".

When published, Palaeoagaracites antiquus was the fifth species of extinct agaric fungus to be described, and the oldest. The three species Aureofungus yaniguaensis, Coprinites dominicana and Protomycena electra are known from the Burdigalian amber mines of the Dominican Republic, while the fourth species Archaeomarasmius leggeti is from the slightly younger Turonian age New Jersey Amber. Since then, the older Gondwanagaricites magnificus has been described from the Crato Formation of Brazil.

== Description ==
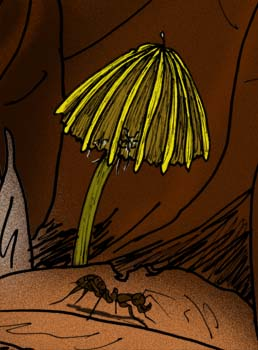
An artist reconstruction of Palaeoagaricites antiquus and Mycetophagites atrebora.

The holotype of Palaeoagaracites is a single, partly decomposed fruit body without any associated structures preserved in a rectangular piece of yellow amber approximately 3.25 cm (1.28 in) by 1.25 cm (0.49 in) by 1.0 cm (0.39 in). The pileus is 2.2 millimetres (0.087 in) in diameter and has a convex shape. The flesh is a bluish-gray color, hairy, and radially furrowed with sixteen grooves visible on the intact section of pileus. The margin is curved slightly inward. The lamellae, or gills, though slightly decomposed, are subdivided into short sections ranging from 85 μm to 110 μm in length. The stipe was not preserved with the cap. The basidiospores, present as both light and dark colored spores on the gill sides, are smooth and oval. Each basidiospore is approximately 3 to 4.5 μm long. While mature light colored spores are present in many agarics, darker colored mature spores are found in some genera.

Palaeoagaracites presents the oldest, and only, evidence of fungal parasitism by other fungi in the fossil record. The fossil displays a complex interrelationship between three different fungal genera. The preserved P. antiquus cap is host to both a mycoparasitic fungus and a hypermycoparasitic fungus. The surface of the Palaeoagaracites specimen hosts the extinct necrotroph fungus Mycetophagites atrebora. The mycelia of Mycetophagites are found across the surface of the P. antiquus pileus, and the hyphae penetrate into the P. antiquus tissues themselves forming necrotic areas. Mycetophagites is in turn host to a hypermycoparasitic necrotrophic fungus species Entropezites patricii. Hyphae of Entropezites are preserved penetrating the Mycetophagites hyphae, forming areas of decomposing tissue. Entropezites also displays a range of growth stages for probable zygospores.

The combined distinguishable characters of Palaeoagaracites were not enough for Poinar and Buckley to place the genus further than Agaricales incertae sedis. The overall size, shape of the spores, and structure of the cap hint at a relationship to the genera Mycena, Marasmius and Collybia.
