= Peloronectria =

Scientific classification
- Kingdom: Fungi
- Division: Ascomycota
- Class: Sordariomycetes
- Order: Hypocreales
- Family: incertae sedis
- Genus: Peloronectria; Möller

Type species
- Peloronectria vinosa Möller

Genus of fungi

Peloronectria is a genus of fungi in the Hypocreales order. The relationship of this taxon to other taxa within the order is unknown (incertae sedis), and it has not yet been placed with certainty into any family. Unchanged in 2020.

== Species ==
As accepted by Species Fungorum;

- Peloronectria bambusina Teixeira (1955)
- Peloronectria umbilicata Syd. & P. Syd. (1907)
- Peloronectria vinosa Möller (1901)
