= Tilakidium =

Scientific classification
- Kingdom: Fungi
- Division: Ascomycota
- Class: Sordariomycetes
- Order: Hypocreales
- Family: incertae sedis
- Genus: Tilakidium; Vaidya (1986)

Type species
- Tilakidium indicum Vaidya, C.D.Naik & Rathod (1986)

Genus of fungi

Tilakidium is a fungal genus in the order Hypocreales. The relationship of this taxon to other taxa within the order is unknown (incertae sedis), and it has not yet been placed with certainty into any family. This is a monotypic genus, containing the single species Tilakidium indicum.
