= Hapsidospora =

Scientific classification
- Kingdom: Fungi
- Division: Ascomycota
- Class: Sordariomycetes
- Order: Hypocreales
- Family: incertae sedis
- Genus: Hapsidospora; Malloch & Cain

Type species
- Hapsidospora irregularis Malloch & Cain

Genus of fungi

Hapsidospora is a genus of fungi in the Hypocreales order. The relationship of this taxon to other taxa within the order is unknown (incertae sedis), and it has not yet been placed with certainty into any family. Unchanged in 2020.

== Species ==
As accepted by Species Fungorum;

- Hapsidospora irregularis Malloch & Cain (1970)
- Hapsidospora milkoi Beliakova (1975)
