= Entropezites =

Entropezites Temporal range: Albian

Scientific classification
- Kingdom: Fungi
- Division: Ascomycota
- Class: Sordariomycetes
- Order: Hypocreales
- Family: incertae sedis
- Genus: †Entropezites; Poinar & Buckley 2007
- Species: †E. patricii

Binomial name
- †Entropezites patricii Poinar & Buckley 2007

Extinct genus of fungi

Entropezites is an extinct monotypic genus of hypermycoparasitic fungus in the order Hypocreales. At present it contains the single species Entropezites patricii.

The genus is solely known from the Lower Cretaceous, Upper Albian stage (about 100 Ma), Burmese amber deposits in Myanmar. Mycetophagites is one of only two known instances of hyperfungal species known in the fossil record, and is the oldest to be described.

== History and classification ==
The genus is known only from the single holotype, number "AB-368", hyphae parasitizing a single partial fruiting body specimen. When described the mushroom is part of in the private collection of Ron Buckley of Florence, Kentucky, USA. The collection has been sold and is now owned by Deniz Erin of Istanbul, Turkey. AB-368 was collected from one of the amber mines in the Hukawng Valley area southwest of Maingkhwan, Kachin Region, Northern Myanmar. It was first studied by a pair of researchers led by Dr George Poinar from Oregon State University who worked with Ron Buckley. Poinar and Buckley published their 2007 type description in Mycological Research, journal of The British Mycological Society. The genus has been assigned the MycoBank number MB501250, with the species being assigned number MB501251.

The generic epithet Entropezites is Greek in derivation and is a combination of the words entrope meaning "to turn inward" and ites which means "pertaining to" referencing the hypermycoparasitic nature of the species.

When published, Entropezites patricii, its host Mycetophagites atrebora and M. atrebora's host Palaeoagaracites antiquus were the first known instance of hyperparasitism on mycoparasitism to be described in the fossil record, and the oldest. The fossil shows that this type of fungal parasitic relationship had been established by the Albian, 100 million years ago. An earlier instance of mycoparasitism is known from the extinct species Palaeoserenomyces allenbyensis and Cryptodidymosphaerites princetonensis described in 1998 from cherts found in British Columbia, Canada.

== Description ==
The holotype of Entropezites consists of hyphae which form a complex and extensive intergrowth with the Mycetophagites atrebora host hyphae. The fungi are preserved in a rectangular piece of yellow amber approximately 3.25 cm (1.28 in) by 1.25 cm (0.49 in) by 1.0 cm (0.39 in). The pileus is 2.2 millimetres (0.087 in) in diameter and possesses a convex shape with the flesh a bluish gray color and hairy. The hyphae are very small, ranging from 1 to 2.5 μm in diameter and hyaline. The nonseptate hyphae are branched, intergrown with and penetrating the host hyphae. Entropezites hyphae penetrate host areas of necrotic tissue. The specimen sports a number of simple, hyaline conidiophores 7–10 μm in length which are borne upright from the hyphae. Each of the conidiophores is borne singly or as sparse clusters and are upright or almost upright. The single-celled condia are borne in chains on the conidiophore tips. As with the other organs of Entropezites, the spherical to cylindrical condia are hyaline in coloration. Also present are possible zygospores ranging from 15 to 30 μm in diameter.

Entropezites presents the oldest evidence of fungal hyperparasitism by other fungi in the fossil record. The fossil displays a complex interrelationship between three different fungal genera. The preserved Palaeoagaracites antiquus cap is host to both a mycoparasitic fungus and a hypermycoparasitic fungus. The surface of the gilled fungus Palaeoagaracites specimen hosts the Mycetophagites atrebora mycelia. The mycelia of Mycetophagites are found across the surface of the P. antiquus pileus, and the hyphae penetrate into the P. antiquus tissues themselves, forming necrotic areas. Mycetophagites is in turn host to a hypermycoparasitic necrotrophic fungus species Entropezites patricii. Hyphae of Entropezites are preserved, penetrating the Mycetophagites hyphae forming areas of decomposing tissues. Entropezites also displays a range of growth stages for probable zygospores.

The combined distinguishable characters of Entropezites were not enough for Poinar and Buckley to place the genus further than Hypocreales incertae sedis. Where the hyphae of Entropezites penetrate into the Mycetophagites hyphae, distinct areas of necrotic tissue appear to be present. The necrotrophic nature of the interaction is similar to the modern genera Penicillium, Schizophyllum and Trichoderma. However the extensive intergrowth of the host and parasite hyphae is distinct from those found in the modern genera.
