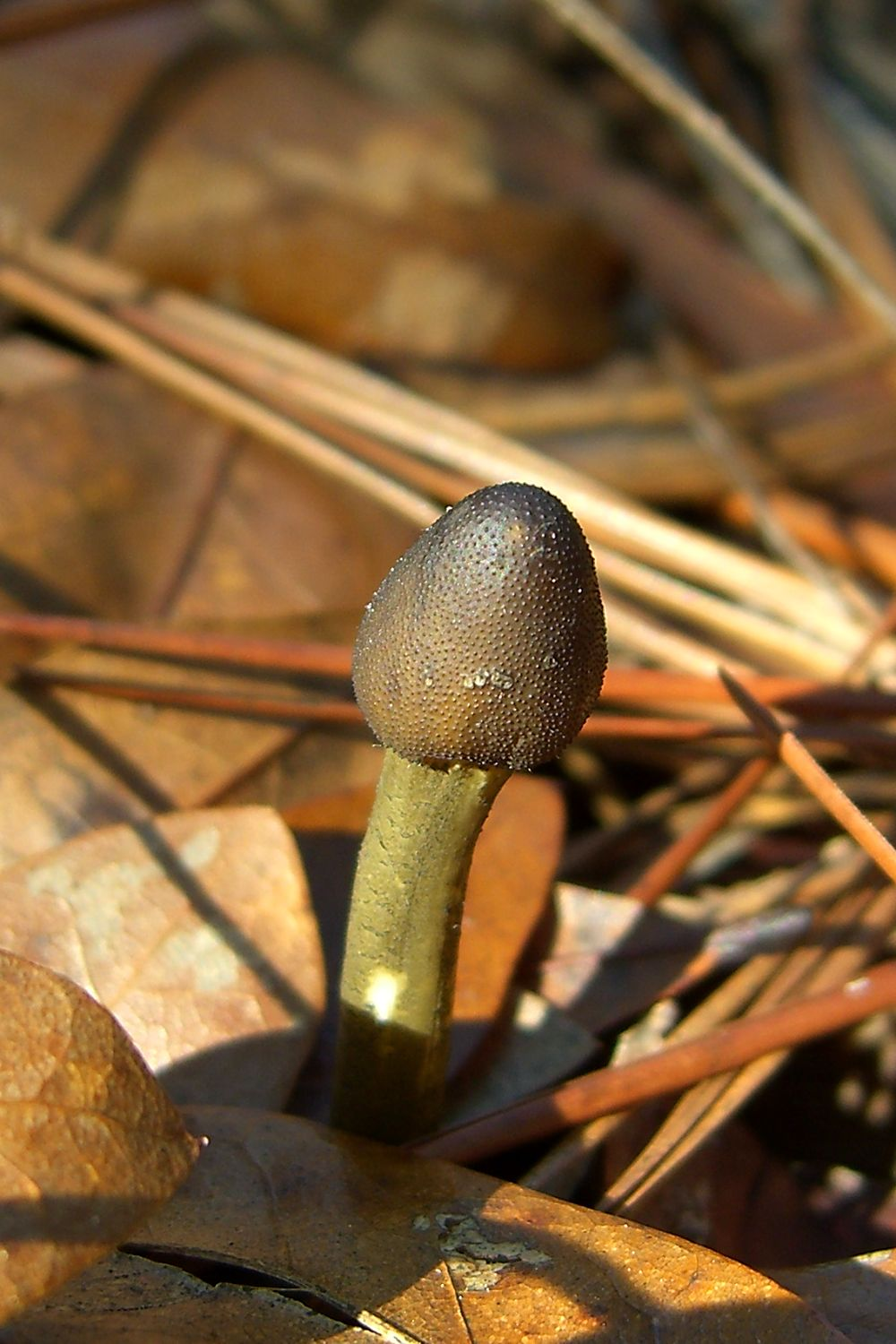
- Tolypocladium sp.

Scientific classification
- Kingdom: Fungi
- Division: Ascomycota
- (unranked): Sordariomyceta
- Class: Sordariomycetes
- Subclass: Hypocreomycetidae
- Order: Hypocreales; Lindau (1897)

= Hypocreales =

Order of fungi

The Hypocreales are an order of fungi within the class Sordariomycetes.

In 2008, it was estimated that it contained some 237 genera, and 2647 species in seven families. Since then, a considerable number of further taxa have been identified, including an additional family, the Stachybotryaceae. Wijayawardene et al. in 2020 added more families and genera to the order. According to the Catalog of Life, as of April 2021 the Hypocreales contains 6 families, 137 genera, and 1411 species. Hyde et al. (2020a) listed 14 families under Hypocreales, while, Wijayawardene et al. (2022) accepted 15 families in the order, where Cylindriaceae was additionally added. Earlier, Hyde et al. (2020a) had placed Cylindriaceae in class Xylariomycetidae. Samarakoon et al. (2022) agreed. Hence, Cylindriaceae should have been excluded from Hypocreales and placed in Xylariomycetidae. Xiao et al. (2022) recently introduced a new family Polycephalomycetaceae to Hypocreales.

== Description ==
Species of Hypocreales are usually recognized by their brightly colored, perithecial ascomata, or spore-producing structures. These are often yellow, orange or red.

== Families ==
(with amount of genera);

- Bionectriaceae (47)
- Calcarisporiaceae (1)
- Clavicipitaceae (50)
- Cocoonihabitaceae (1)
- Cordycipitaceae (21)
- Flammocladiellaceae (1)
- Hypocreaceae (17)
- Myrotheciomycetaceae (4)
- Nectriaceae (70)
- Niessliaceae (21)
- Ophiocordycipitaceae (12)
- Polycephalomycetaceae
- Sarocladiaceae (2: Parasarocladium - 9 species and Sarocladium - 30 species)
- Stachybotryaceae (39)
- Tilachlidiaceae (3)

Former families:

- Cylindriaceae (1 - Cylindrium) removed to Xylariomycetidae per Hyde et al. (2020a) and Samarakoon et al. (2022)

== Genera incertae sedis ==
According to a 2020 review of fungal classification, the following genera within the Hypocreales have an uncertain taxonomic placement (incertae sedis), and have not been assigned to any family:

- Acremoniopsis A.Giraldo, Gené & Guarro (2014) – 1 sp.
- Andreaeana (Palm & Jochems) Palm & Jochems (1924) - 1 sp.
- Bulbithecium Udagawa & T.Muroi (1990) – 1 sp.
- Cephalosporiopsis Peyronel (1916) – 10 spp.
- Chondronectria Etayo, Flakus & Kukwa (2017) – 1 sp.
- Cylindronectria Etayo (2017) – 1 sp.
- Diploospora Grove (1916) – ca. 7 spp.
- †Entropezites Poinar & R.Buckley 2007) – 1 sp.
- Gynonectria Döbbeler (2012) – 1 sp.
- Hapsidospora Malloch & Cain (1970) – 2 spp.
- Haptospora G.L.Barron (1991) – 3 spp.
- Illosporiopsis D.Hawksw. (2001) – 1 sp.
- Illosporium Mart. (1817) – 17 spp.
- Leptobarya Etayo (2017) – 2 spp.
- Metadothella Henn. (1904) – 1 sp.
- Munkia Speg. (1886) – 4 spp.
- †Mycetophagites Poinar & R.Buckley (2007) – 1 sp.
- Neomunkia Petr. (1847) – 1 sp.
- Peloronectria Möller (1901) – 3 spp.
- Pseudoacremonium Crous (2014) – 1 sp.
- Pseudomeliola Speg. (1889) – 10 spp.
- Rodentomyces Doveri, Pecchia, Sarrocco & Vannacci (2016) – 1 sp.
- Roselliniella Vain (1921) – 19 spp.
- Saksenamyces A.N.Rai & P.N.Singh (2018) – 1 sp.
- Sedecimiella K.L.Pang, Alias & E.B.G.Jones (2010) – 1 sp.
- Sorosporella N.Sorokin, 1888 - 2spp.
- Stanjemonium W.Gams, O'Donnell, Schroers & M.Chr. (1999) – 4 spp.
- Stilbella Lindau (1900) – 61 spp.
- Ticonectria Döbbeler (1998) – 3 spp.
- Tilakidium Vaidya, C.D.Naik & Rathod (1986) – 1 sp.

Genera formerly included:

- Berkelella (Sacc.) Sacc. (1891) – 2 spp. now in Clavicipitaceae 2022
