= Mycetophagites =

Mycetophagites Temporal range: Albian

Scientific classification
- Kingdom: Fungi
- Division: Ascomycota
- Class: Sordariomycetes
- Order: Hypocreales
- Family: incertae sedis
- Genus: †Mycetophagites
- Species: †M. atrebora

Binomial name
- †Mycetophagites atrebora Poinar & Buckley 2007

Extinct genus of fungi

Mycetophagites is an extinct fungal genus of mycoparasitic in the order Hypocreales. A monotypic genus, it contains the single species Mycetophagites atrebora.

The genus is solely known from the Lower Cretaceous, Upper Albian stage (about 100 Ma), Burmese amber deposits in Myanmar. Mycetophagites is one of only two known instances of hyperfungal species known in the fossil record, and is the oldest to be described.

== History and classification ==
The genus is known only from the single holotype, number "AB-368", hyphae parasitizing a single partial fruiting body specimen. When described the mushroom is part of in the private collection of Ron Buckley of Florence, Kentucky, USA. The collection has been sold and is now owned by Deniz Erin of Istanbul, Turkey. AB-368 was collected from one of the amber mines in the Hukawng Valley area southwest of Maingkhwan, Kachin Region, Northern Myanmar. It was first studied by a pair of researchers led by George Poinar from Oregon State University who worked with Ron Buckley. Poinar and Buckley published their 2007 type description in Mycological Research, journal of The British Mycological Society. The genus has been assigned the MycoBank number MB510323, with the species being assigned number MB510324.

The generic epithet Mycetophagites is Greek in derivation and is a combination of the words myketos meaning "fungus" and phagein which means "to eat" referencing the mycoparasitic nature of the species.

When published, Mycetophagites atrebora was the first known instance of hyperparasitism on mycoparasitism to be described in the fossil record, and the oldest. The fossil shows that this type of fungal parasitic relationship had been established by the Albian, 100 million years ago. An earlier instance of mycoparasitism is known from the extinct species Palaeoserenomyces allenbyensis and Cryptodidymosphaerites princetonensis described in 1998 from cherts found in British Columbia, Canada.

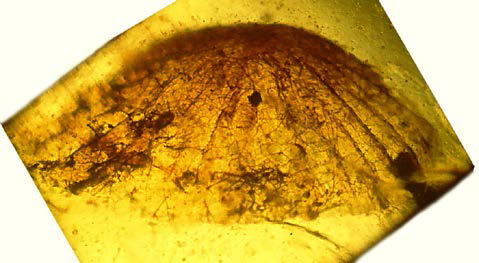
Palaeoagaricites antiquus host cap

== Description ==
The holotype of Mycetophagites consists of mycelium in a lone, partly decomposed fruiting body without any associated structures. The fungi are preserved in a rectangular piece of yellow amber approximately 3.25 cm (1.28 in) by 1.25 cm (0.49 in) by 1.0 cm (0.39 in). The pileus is 2.2 millimetres (0.087 in) in diameter and possess a convex shape with the flesh a bluish gray color and hairy. The mycelium is composed of thick, septate, hyphae 4–6 μm in diameter. The hyphae sport septate dark conidiophores that are simple or sparsely branched. Each of the conidiophores are born singly or as sparse clusters and are upright or almost upright. The 8–10 μm long conidia on the conidiophores are oriented in short chains or singally on the ends of conidiophores. The conidia are generally simple and ovoid.

Mycetophagites presents the oldest evidence of fungal parasitism by other fungi in the fossil record. The fossil displays a complex interrelationship between three different fungal genera. The preserved Palaeoagaracites antiquus cap is host to both the mycoparasitic fungus and a hypermycoparasitic fungus. The surface of the gilled fungus Palaeoagaracites specimen hosts the Mycetophagites atrebora mycelia. The mycelia of Mycetophagites are found across the surface of the P. antiquus pileus, and the hyphae penetrate into the P. antiquus tissues themselves forming necrotic areas. Mycetophagites is in turn host to a hypermycoparasitic necrotrophic fungus species Entropezites patricii. Hyphae of Entropezites are preserved penetrating the Mycetophagites hyphae forming areas of decomposing tissues. Entropezites also displays a range of growth stages for probable zygospores.

The combined distinguishable characters of Mycetophagites were not enough for Poinar and Buckley to place the genus further than Hypocreales incertae sedis. Where the hyphae of Mycetophagites penetrate into the Palaeoagaracites cap, distinct areas of cell lysis appear to be present. The necrotrophic nature of the interaction is similar to the modern genus Sepedonium. However the details of the condia and mycelium are distinct from those found in Sepedonium.
