= Unspecific peroxygenase =

Class of enzymes

Identifiers
- EC no.: 1.11.2.1

Databases
- IntEnz: IntEnz view
- BRENDA: BRENDA entry
- ExPASy: NiceZyme view
- KEGG: KEGG entry
- MetaCyc: metabolic pathway
- PRIAM: profile
- PDB structures: RCSB PDB PDBe PDBsum
Search
- PMC: articles
- PubMed: articles
- NCBI: proteins

Unspecific peroxygenase (EC 1.11.2.1, aromatic peroxygenase, mushroom peroxygenase, haloperoxidase-peroxygenase, Agrocybe aegerita peroxidase) is an enzyme with systematic name substrate:hydrogen peroxide oxidoreductase (RH-hydroxylating or -epoxidising). This enzyme catalyses the following chemical reaction

RH + H_{2}O_{2} $\rightleftharpoons$ ROH + H_{2}O

Unspecific peroxygenase is a heme-thiolate protein comparable to Cytochrome P450 in the ability to catalyze a variety of P450 reactions (hence "unspecific"), but forms a unique, solely fungal, protein family of extracellular enzymes.
