= David Hibbett =

David S. Hibbett
- Born: Cambridge, MA, USA
- Education: Duke University; University of Massachusetts
- Scientific career
- Fields: Mycology
- Workplaces: Clark University
- Author abbrev. (botany): Hibbett

David Hibbett is a professor in biology at Clark University who analyses fungal relationships through DNA analysis. At Clark he concentrates his lab work in evolutionary biology and ecology of Fungi.

He spent 1991 as a Science and Technology Agency of Japan Post-doctoral Fellow at the Tottori Mycological Institute in Tottori, Japan. A year later Hibbett taught microbiology at Framingham State College for the spring semester. From 1993 to 1999, Hibbett was a postdoctoral researcher and then a research associate in the laboratory of Michael Donoghue in the Harvard University Herbaria.

He received his Bachelor of Arts from the Botany Department of University of Massachusetts Amherst and his Ph.D. from the Botany Department of Duke University.

In 2007, Hibbett led the publication of a phylogenetically based classification scheme for the Kingdom Fungi with a long list of international taxonomic specialists, which has remained the standard framework for the higher classification of these organisms. His most cited paper (as of 4 January 2021) with 1755 citations is Reconstructing the early evolution of Fungi using a six-gene phylogeny.
