= Michael Donoghue =

American evolutionary biologist

- Citizenship: United States
- Education: Michigan State University, Harvard University
- Scientific career
- Fields: Evolutionary biology
- Workplaces: Yale University

Michael John Donoghue is an American evolutionary biologist, currently the Sterling Professor of Ecology and Evolutionary Biology at Yale University, and also a published author.

== Career ==
Donoghue earned a bachelor's degree in Botany and Plant Pathology from Michigan State University in 1979. He attended Harvard University for his postgraduate work, attaining a Ph.D. in 1984. He found employment at San Diego State University from 1982 to 1985, the University of Arizona from 1985 to 1992, Harvard University from 1992 to 2000, and finally Yale University since 2000.

Donoghue was also previously the Glaser Distinguished Visiting Professor at Florida International University. He is a Fellow of the American Association for the Advancement of Science and American Academy of Arts and Sciences.

He served as president of the Botanical Society of America.
