= Mycaureola =

Scientific classification
- Kingdom: Fungi
- Division: Basidiomycota
- Class: Agaricomycetes
- Order: Agaricales
- Family: Physalacriaceae
- Genus: Mycaureola; Maire & Chemin (1922)

Type species
- Mycaureola dilseae Maire & Chemin (1922)

Genus of fungi

Mycaureola is a genus of fungi in the family Physalacriaceae of mushrooms. Circumscribed in 1922 by French mycologists René Maire and Émile Chemin, the genus is monotypic, containing the single species Mycaureola dilseae. The fungus is a parasite of the red algal species Dilsea carnosa, on which it causes circular necrotic lesions.

== Taxonomy ==
Mycaureola indica was described in a 1957 publication, but the taxon was later transferred to the genus Polystigma as P. indicum. Molecular phylogenetics placed Mycaureola in the Physalacriaceae, occupying a subclade with species from the genera Rhizomarasmius, Gloiocephala, Xerula, and Oudemansiella.
