= Cibaomyces =

Scientific classification
- Kingdom: Fungi
- Division: Basidiomycota
- Class: Agaricomycetes
- Order: Agaricales
- Family: Physalacriaceae
- Genus: Cibaomyces; Zhu L., Y.J.Hao & J.Qin (2014)

Type species
- Cibaomyces glutinis Zhu L., Y.J.Hao & J.Qin (2014)

Genus of fungi

Cibaomyces is an agaric fungal genus found in China, Japan, France, and Germany in forests containing Fagaceae. It resembles Hymenopellis radicata because of its size, radiating stipe and glutinous cap. Unlike species in the genus Hymenopellis, Cibaomyces produces spiny basidiospores. DNA sequence data show it to be distinct from Dactylosporina, another spiny-spored genus in the Physalacriaceae.

== Etymology ==
The name Cibaomyces is derived from the Chinese word pronounced "Cibao" which means "echinate spores", and the Ancient Greek, "-myces" referring to a fungus.

== Species ==
This genus includes only one species.

Species includes:

- Cibaomyces glutinis
