= Briganti (surname) =

Briganti is an Italian surname, associated with the Italian word Brigantaggio. Notable people with the surname include:

- Giuliano Briganti (1918–1992), Italian art historian
- Marco Briganti (born 1982), Italian footballer
- Vince Briganti (born 1942), Italo-Belgian footballer
- Vincenzo Briganti (1766– 1836), Italian naturalist and mycologist

== See also ==
- Giovanni De Briganti (1892–1937), Italian aviator
