= Ponticulomyces =

Scientific classification
- Kingdom: Fungi
- Division: Basidiomycota
- Class: Agaricomycetes
- Order: Agaricales
- Family: Physalacriaceae
- Genus: Ponticulomyces; R.H.Petersen (2010)

Type species
- Ponticulomyces kedrovayae R.H.Petersen (2010)

Species
- P. kedrovayae; P. orientalis

Genus of fungi

Ponticulomyces is a genus of fungi in the family Physalacriaceae. The genus was described by American mycologist Ron Petersen in 2010. It includes the type species Ponticulomyces kedrovayae, known from Pacific maritime Russia, and the Chinese species P. orientalis, originally described as a member of Oudemansiella in 2000. Both species were reported from Japan in 2012. The generic name, which derives from ponticulus ("to build a bridge"), and myces ("fungus"), suggests a bridge between taxonomic characters common to the genera Oudemansiella and Hymenopellis.
