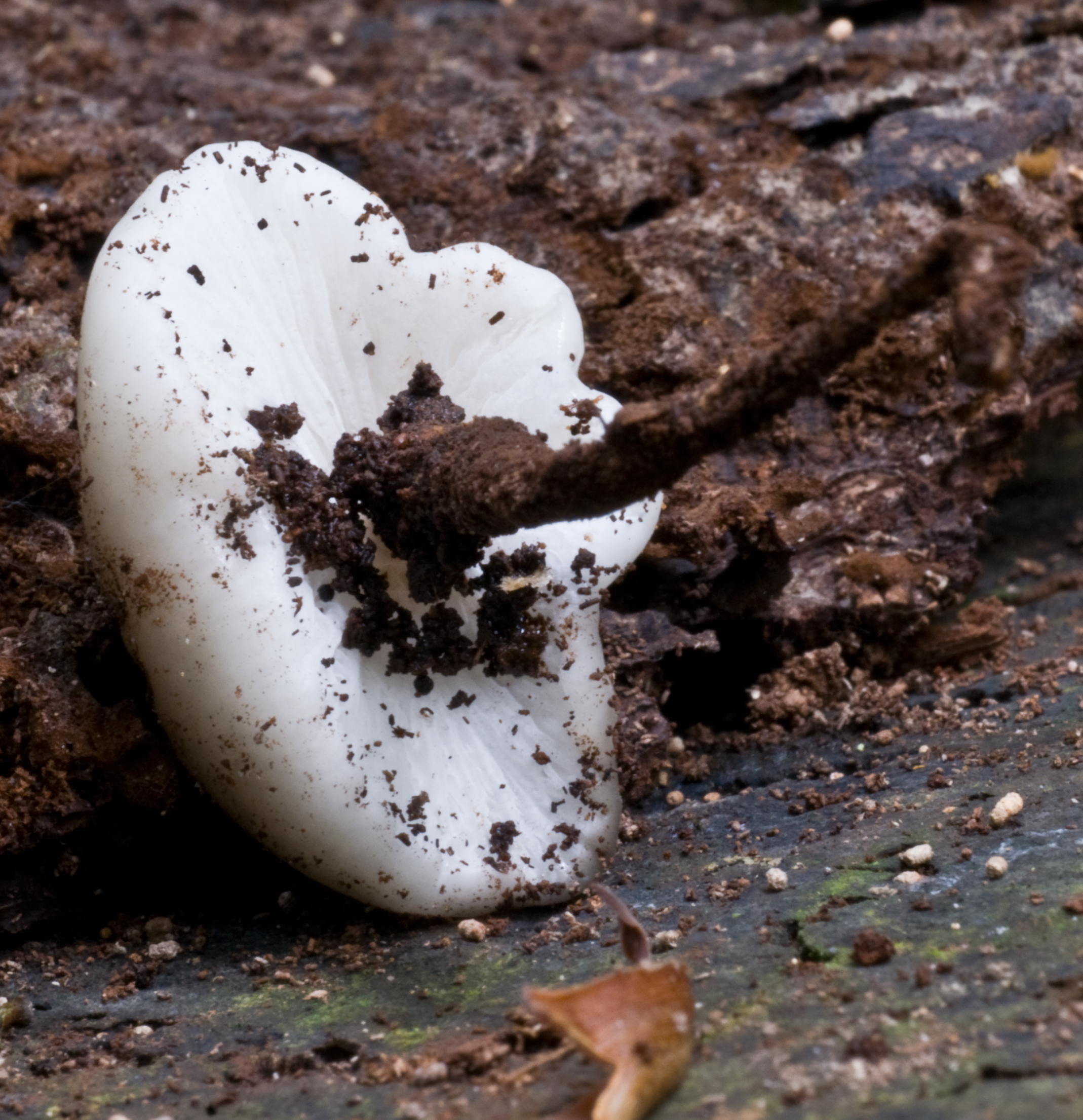
- Cribbea sp. from New South Wales, Australia

Scientific classification
- Kingdom: Fungi
- Division: Basidiomycota
- Class: Agaricomycetes
- Order: Agaricales
- Family: Physalacriaceae
- Genus: Cribbea; A.H.Sm. & D.A.Reid (1962)

Type species
- Cribbea gloriosa (D.A.Reid) A.H.Sm. & D.A.Reid (1962)

Species
- C. andina C. gloriosa C. reticulata C. turbinispora

= Cribbea =

Genus of fungi

Cribbea is a genus of secotioid fungi in the family Physalacriaceae. The genus has a widespread distribution in southern temperate areas, and, according to a 2008 estimate, contains four species. A new species, Cribbea turbinispora, was reported from Australia in 2009, and in the same publication, C. lamellata was synonymized with C. gloriosa. The genus is named after mycologist Joan Cribb, in recognition of her contribution to fungal taxonomy.

Although Rolf Singer, Jorge Eduardo Wright and Egon Horak created the family Cribbeaceae to contain the genus in 1963, molecular phylogenetic analysis has shown that the genus belong to the Physalacriaceae, with affinities to the genera Xerula and Oudemansiella.
