= G. lutea =

G. lutea may refer to:

- Gagea lutea, a Eurasian plant
- Gastrodia lutea, an achlorophyllous orchid
- Gena lutea, a top snail
- Gentiana lutea, a gentian native to Europe
- Geocrinia lutea, a frog endemic to Southwest Australia
- Gliricidia lutea, a flowering plant
- Gloiocephala lutea, a gilled mushroom
- Gloriosa lutea, an ornamental plant
