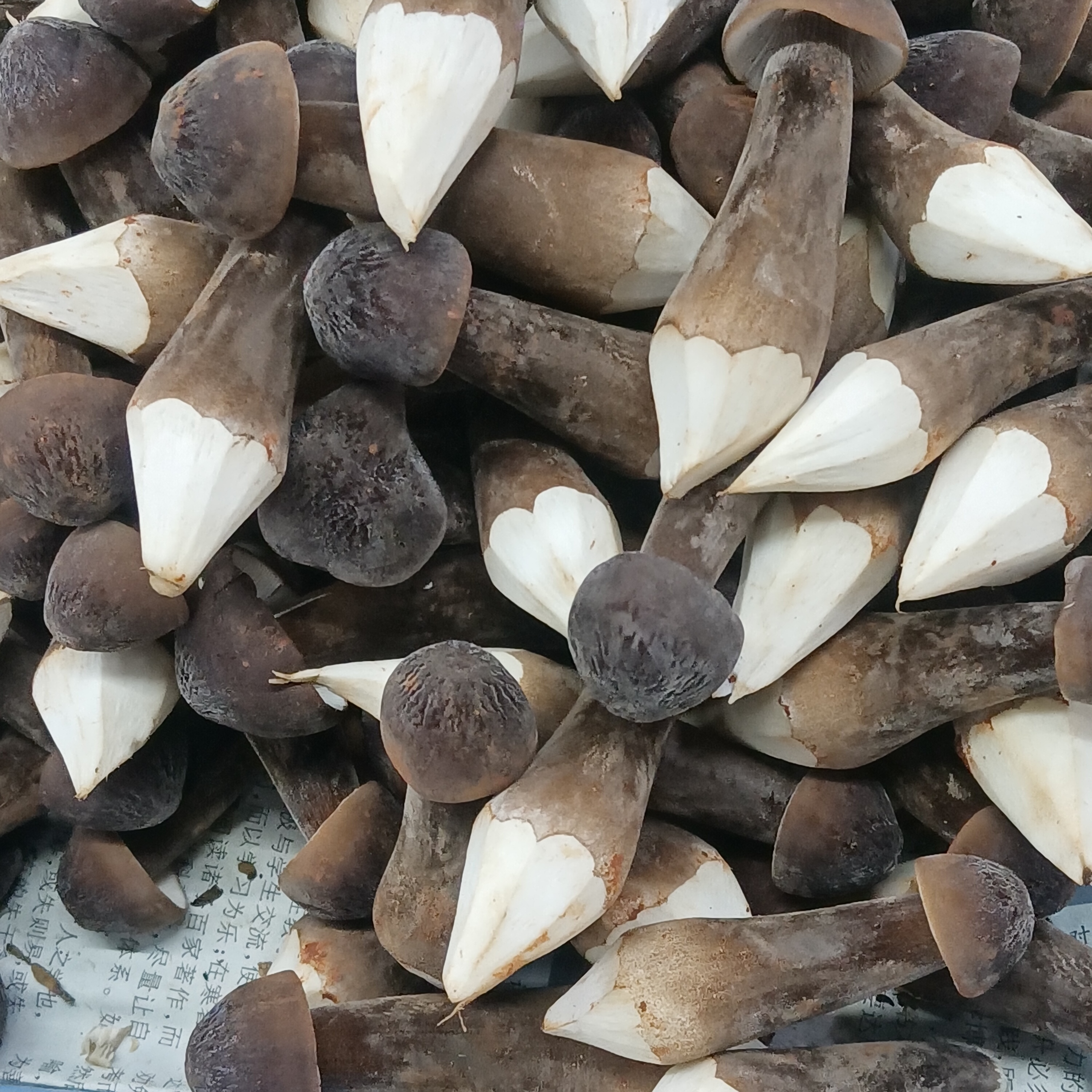
- Commercially cultivated ones are shaved into a pencil shape

Scientific classification
- Kingdom: Fungi
- Division: Basidiomycota
- Class: Agaricomycetes
- Order: Agaricales
- Family: Physalacriaceae
- Genus: Oudemansiella
- Species: O. raphanipes

Binomial name
- Oudemansiella raphanipes (Berk.) Pegler & T.W.K. Young (1987) [1986]

Synonyms
- List: Agaricus raphanipes Berk. (1850); Collybia raphanipes (Berk.) Sacc. (1887); Xerula raphanipes (Berk.) Dörfelt (1983); Xerula chiangmaiae var. raphanipes (Berk.) R.H. Petersen & Nagas. (2006) [2005]; Hymenopellis raphanipes (Berk.) R.H. Petersen (2010); Xerula chiangmaiae R.H. Petersen & Nagas. (2006) [2005]; Oudemansiella chiangmaiae (R.H. Petersen & Nagas.) Zhu L. Yang, G.M. Muell., G. Kost & Rexer (2009); Hymenopellis chiangmaiae (R.H. Petersen & Nagas.) R.H. Petersen (2010)

= Oudemansiella raphanipes =

Species of fungus

Oudemansiella raphanipes
- Mycological characteristics
- Gills on hymenium
- Cap is convex or depressed
- Hymenium is adnate or sinuate
- Stipe is bare
- Spore print is white to cream
- Ecology is saprotrophic
- Edibility is edible

Oudemansiella raphanipes, also known as Hymenopellis raphanipes, is a species of fungus from Physalacriaceae family found in East and South Asia.

== Description ==
The mushroom can be small or large in size. The cap is recorded to range 23–95 mm in diameter. Its shape is hemispherical when young, later slightly convex or concave. Its color is brown. The flesh is white and when broken, doesn't change color. The gills are adnate, sinuate or slightly decurrent, white to cream-colored, occasionally having brown spots. The stem is recorded to range 64–200 mm long and 4–12 mm thick in diameter, covered with small scales. Solid. Pseudorhiza is recorded to range 35–75 mm long and 8–13 mm thick in diameter, its color is from white to brown.

== Taxonomy ==
This fungus was first taxonomically described by Miles Joseph Berkeley in 1850 using the specimen collection by J. D. Hooker from Darjeeling (India) as Agaricus (Collybia) raphanipes.

David Pegler & T.W.K. Young renamed this fungus Oudemansiella raphanipes in 1986.

R.H. Petersen in 2010 designated genus Hymenopellis and renamed this fungus Hymenopellis raphanipes. Later, Vellinga (2011) noticed that Hymenopellis is not monophyletic. Various academic papers, while aware of this 2010 rename, kept on a bigger Oudemansiella and Oudemansiella raphanipes.

This species, O. raphanipes, is conspecific with O. chiangmaiae.

== Habitat ==
It grows on rotten wood covered in soil in East and South Asia.

Reported in Australia, China, India, Japan and Thailand. Phylogenetic evidence indicated its being in South Korea. Its being in Australia needs further investigations to confirm.

== As food ==
This mushroom is edible. Commercially cultured in China and Malaysia. It is cultivated under the name "Heipijizong", which means "Black Termite Mushroom".
