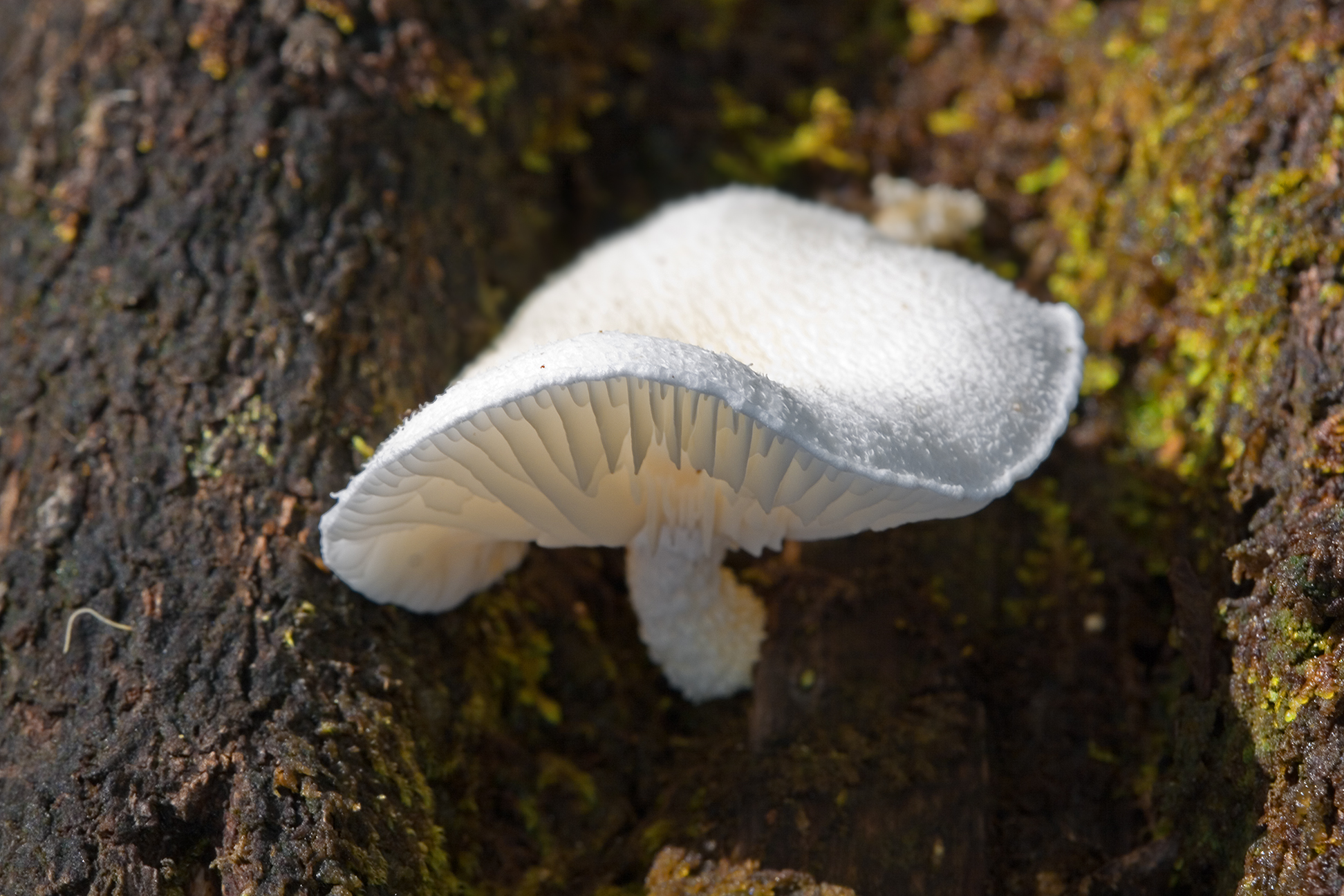

Scientific classification
- Kingdom: Fungi
- Division: Basidiomycota
- Class: Agaricomycetes
- Order: Agaricales
- Family: Physalacriaceae
- Genus: Oudemansiella
- Species: O. australis

Binomial name
- Oudemansiella australis G.Stev. & G.M.Taylor (1964)

= Oudemansiella australis =

Species of fungus

Oudemansiella australis is a species of gilled mushroom in the family Physalacriaceae. It is found in Australasia, where it grows on rotting wood. It produces fruit bodies that are white, with caps up to 5.5 cm (2.2 in) in diameter, attached to short, thick stems.

== Taxonomy and classification ==
The species was reported as new to science by Greta Stevenson and G.M. Taylor in a 1964 publication, based on a specimen found in March, 1961. According to the 1986 arrangement of Pegler and Young, based largely on spore structure, Oudemansiella australis is classified in the section Oudemansiella of genus Oudemansiella, along with the species O. mucida, O. venesolamellata, and O. canarii. In a more recent classification proposed by Yang and colleagues, O. australis is in section Oudemansiella, which contains tropical to south temperate species, such as O. platensis, O. canarii and O. crassifolia. These species are characterised by having an ixotrichoderm cap cuticle, meaning it is made of gelatinized filamentous hyphae of different lengths arranged in roughly parallel fashion. These hyphae are often mixed with inflated cells that usually occur in chains.

New Zealand mycologist Geoff Ridley has proposed the common name "porcelain slimecap" for the mushroom.

== Description ==
Oudemansiella australis mushrooms have a cap that is 3–5.5 cm (1.2–2.2 in) in diameter, and initially white becoming a light yellowish brown (fawn) in age. It has a convex shape, but splits at the margins. The cap cuticle splits irregularly to reveal firm white flesh underneath. The gills are adnate, powdery white, and moderately distantly spaced. They are long and short intercalated, with deep with ribs at the base. The stem is 2.5 cm (1.0 in) long by 0.6–1 cm (0.2–0.4 in) thick, attached off-centre to the cap. It is white on the upper part, changing to fawn around the swollen base. The flesh is solid, white, and silky.

The spore print is white. Spores are spherical or nearly so, measuring 24 by 21 μm, with thick walls (about 1 μm). They are non-amyloid, and have a prominent hilar appendix (a depression in the surface where the spore was once connected to the sterigmata).

== Habitat and distribution ==
The fungus grows on rotting wood. The first recorded collection was made in the open near a forest in Wainui Valley, Wellington. It has since been found in Australia and Papua New Guinea.
