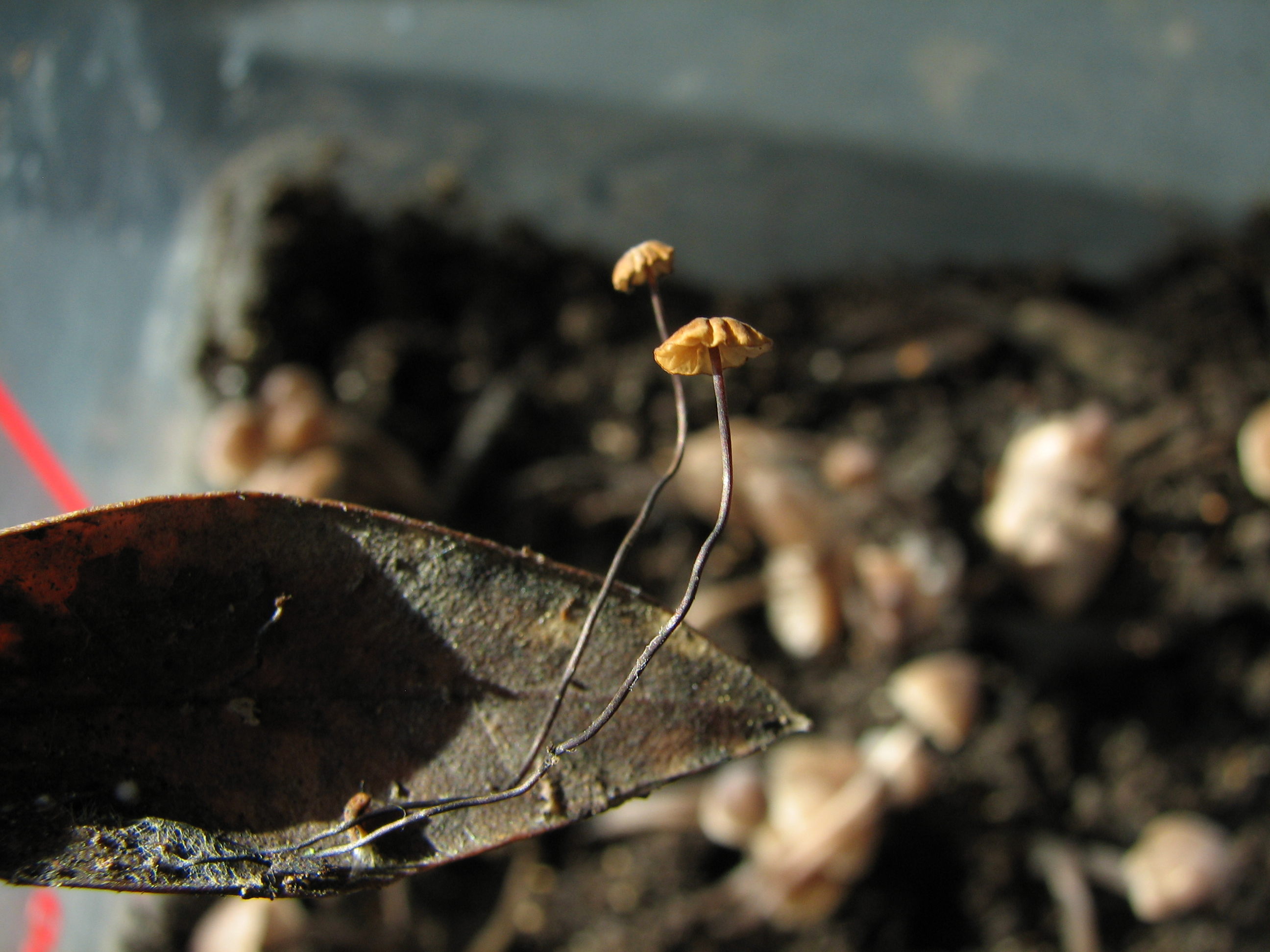
- Cryptomarasmius corbariensis

Scientific classification
- Kingdom: Fungi
- Division: Basidiomycota
- Class: Agaricomycetes
- Order: Agaricales
- Family: Physalacriaceae
- Genus: Cryptomarasmius; T.S.Jenkinson & Desjardin (2014)

Type species
- Cryptomarasmius corbariensis (Roum.) T.S.Jenkinson & Desjardin (2014)

Synonyms
- Marasmius sect. Hygrometrici Kühner (1933)

= Cryptomarasmius =

Genus of fungi

Cryptomarasmius is a genus of fungi in the family Physalacriaceae.

== Taxonomy ==
The genus covers species formerly placed in Marasmius, section Hygrometrici. The section Hygrometrici was described in 1933 by French mycologist Robert Kühner (as "Hygrometriceae") to contain Marasmius species that were small with a dark, wiry stipe, gills not arranged in a collar around the stipe, and a dark cap with a layer of broom cells. The type species is Cryptomarasmius corbariensis (formerly Marasmius corbariensis and originally Agaricus androsaceus var. hygrometricus, first described in 1852 by Vincenzo Briganti). Cryptomarasmius combines the words crypto meaning "hidden" and Marasmius, alluding to the historical placement of the species within Marasmius as well as the often hidden, minute fruit bodies they produce. A more recent studies show Cryptomarasmius to be a sister taxon to Naiadolina.

== Species ==
Fourteen species were originally transferred to Cryptomarasmius from Marasmius. The authors suggest that there are several more that should probably be moved from section Hygrometrici, but they only made new combinations for those species with type specimens that were available for DNA sequencing or study.

- Cryptomarasmius aucubae
- Cryptomarasmius corbariensis
- Cryptomarasmius crescentiae
- Cryptomarasmius dicandinus
- Cryptomarasmius exustoides
- Cryptomarasmius fishii
- Cryptomarasmius ilicis
- Cryptomarasmius kroumirensis
- Cryptomarasmius magnoliae
- Cryptomarasmius micraster
- Cryptomarasmius minutus
- Cryptomarasmius paucilamellatus
- Cryptomarasmius rhopalostylidis
- Cryptomarasmius sphaerodermus
- Cryptomarasmius thwaitesii
