= Paraxerula =

Scientific classification
- Kingdom: Fungi
- Division: Basidiomycota
- Class: Agaricomycetes
- Order: Agaricales
- Family: Physalacriaceae
- Genus: Paraxerula; R.H.Petersen (2010)

Type species
- Paraxerula american (Dörfelt) R.H.Petersen (2010)

Species
- P. americana P. caussei P. ellipsospora P. hongoi

Genus of fungi

Paraxerula is a genus of fungi in the family Physalacriaceae. It was circumscribed in 2010 by mycologist Ron Petersen to replace Xerula section Hyalosetae, proposed by Heinrich Dörfelt in 1984. Petersen originally included P. caussei, P. hongoi, and the type species P. americana. The Chinese species P. ellipsospora was added to the genus in 2014.

== Description ==
Paraxerula species have collybioid fruitbodies with rooting stipes, resembling Strobilurus. The species are associated with the saprobic breakdown of deciduous trees.
