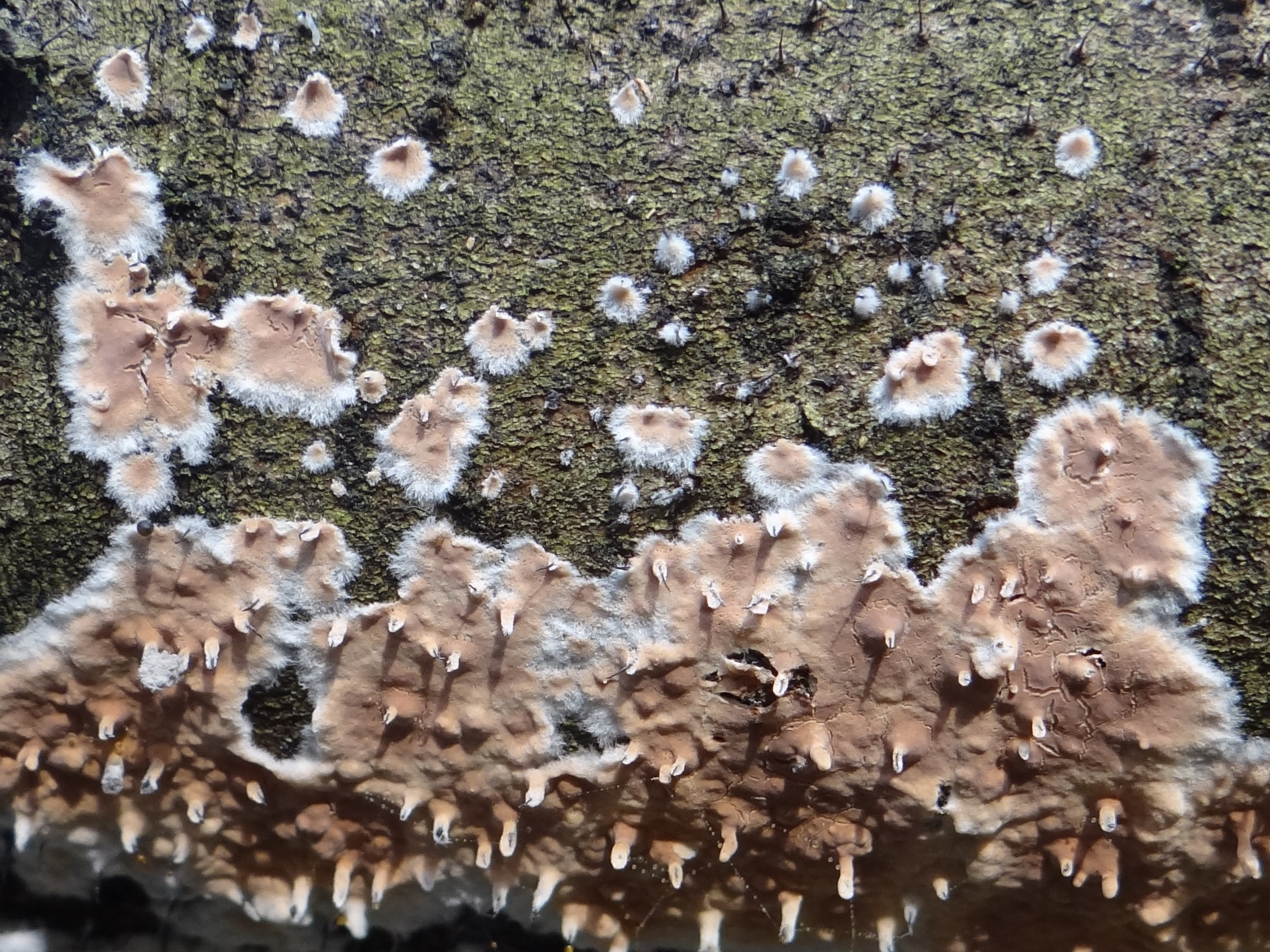

Scientific classification
- Kingdom: Fungi
- Division: Basidiomycota
- Class: Agaricomycetes
- Order: Agaricales
- Family: Physalacriaceae
- Genus: Cylindrobasidium
- Species: C. laeve

Binomial name
- Cylindrobasidium laeve (Pers.) Chamuris, 1984

Synonyms
- Athelia pellicularis (P. Karst.) Donk, 1957; Cladoderris minima Berk. & Broome, 1878; Corticium confluens var. subcalceum P. Karst., 1888; Corticium confluens var. triviale P. Karst., 1888; Corticium laeve Pers., 1794; Corticium laeve f. cucullatum Bourdot & Galzin, 1928; Corticium laeve f. pallida P. Karst.; Corticium laeve subsp. pelliculare P. Karst., 1889; Corticium laeve var. subcalceum (P. Karst.) P. Karst., 1892; Corticium laeve var. triviale (P. Karst.) P. Karst., 1892; Corticium pelliculare (P. Karst.) P. Karst., 1889; Cylindrobasidium evolvens var. cucullatum (Bourdot & Galzin) Hjortstam & Ryvarden, 1984; Hypochnus laevis (Pers.) Bonord., 1851; Kneiffia laevis (Pers.) Bres., 1903; Stereum minimum (Berk. & Broome) Lloyd, 1913; Terana laevis (Pers.) Kuntze, 1891; Thelephora laevis (Pers.) Pers., 1801; Thelephora laevis Ehrh. ex Willd., 1787

= Cylindrobasidium laeve =

Species of fungus

Cylindrobasidium is a species of fungus in the family Physalacriaceae.

A product which contains Cylindrobasidium laeve as the active ingredient can be used as a mycoherbicide to control Acacia mearnsii (black wattle) in South Africa.

== Taxonomy ==
Initially described by Persoon in 1794 as Corticium laeve, the modern Index Fungorum name was given in 1984 by George Peter Chamuris.

== In Europe ==
It is very common in Poland, usually found on various types of forests, bushes, parks, gardens, roadsides, trunks and branches of deciduous trees. It was found on the following species and types of trees: maples, chestnut tree, alder, silver birch, hornbeam, hazel, hawthorn, beech, hairy ash, apple, black poplar, plum tree, Robinia pseudoacacia, willow, and lime. It occurs rarely on conifers.

== Gallery ==
Evidence of C. laeve

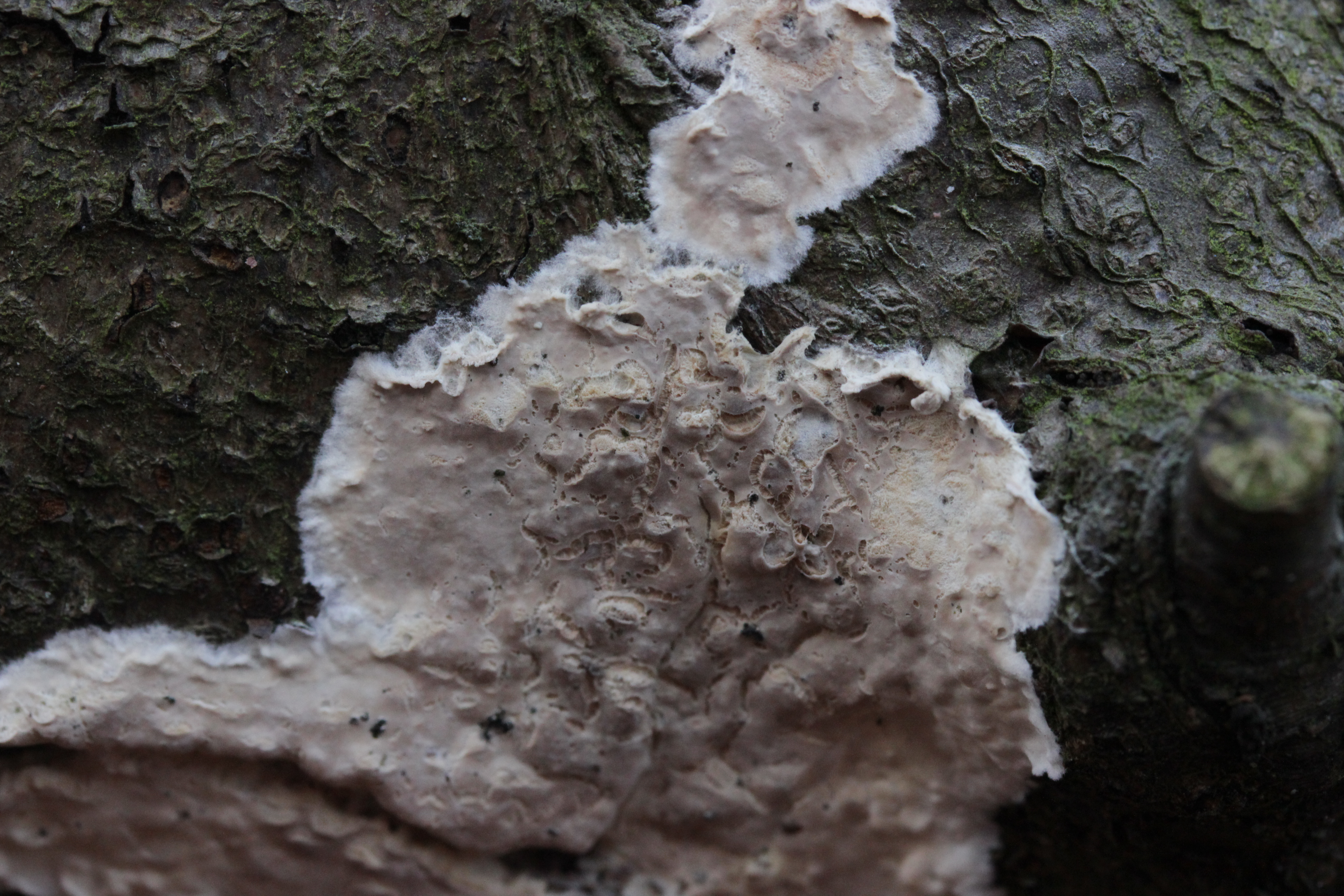

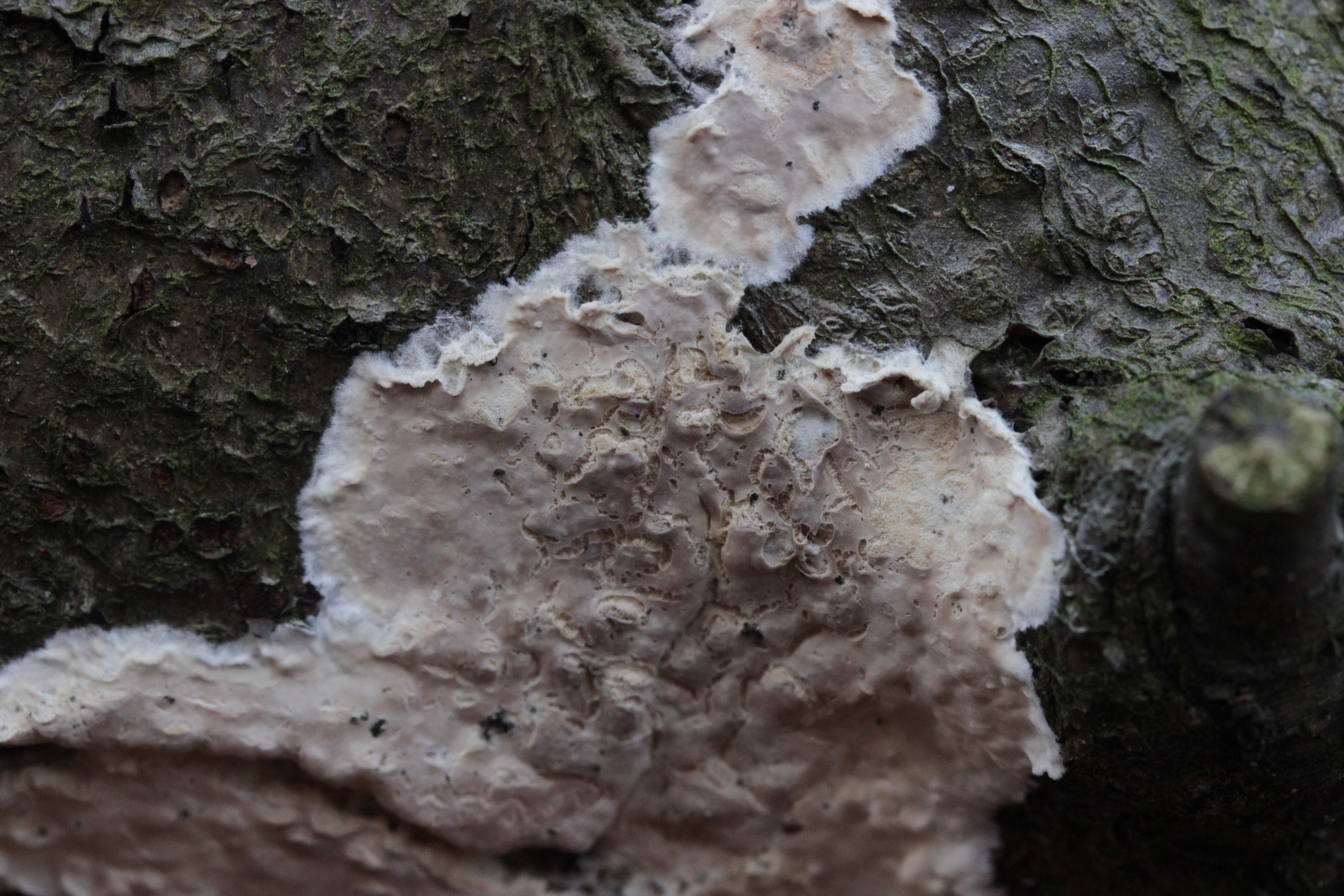

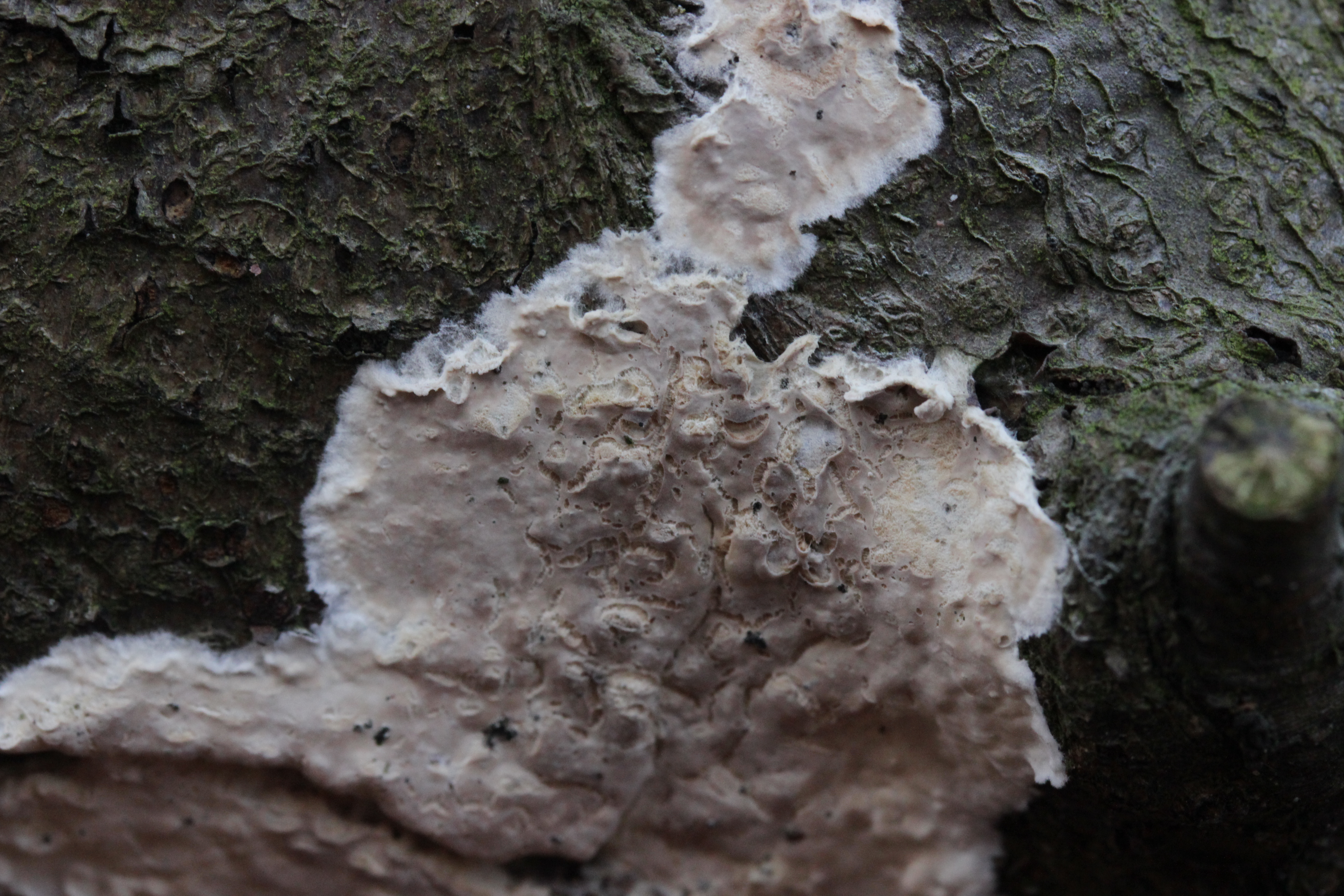

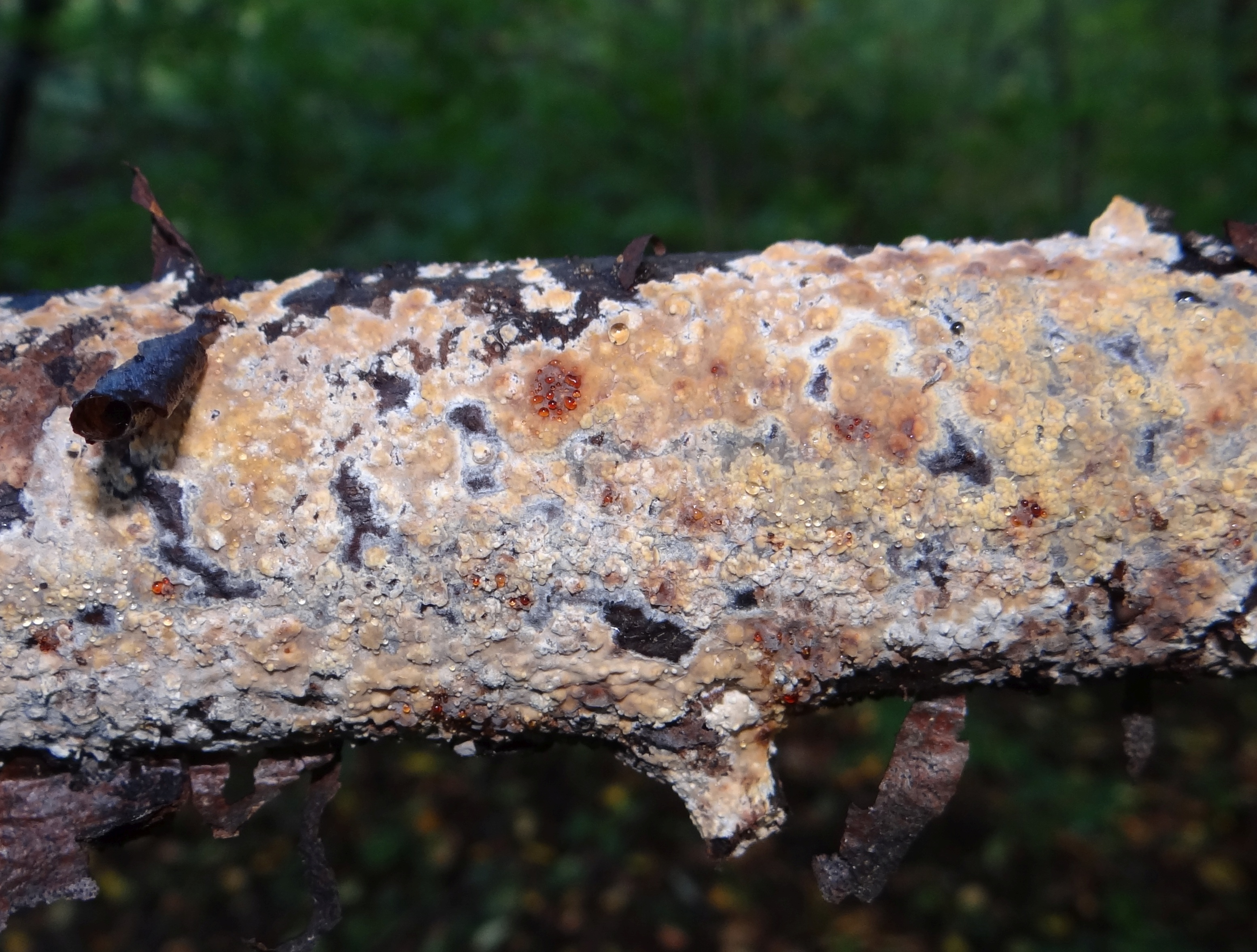

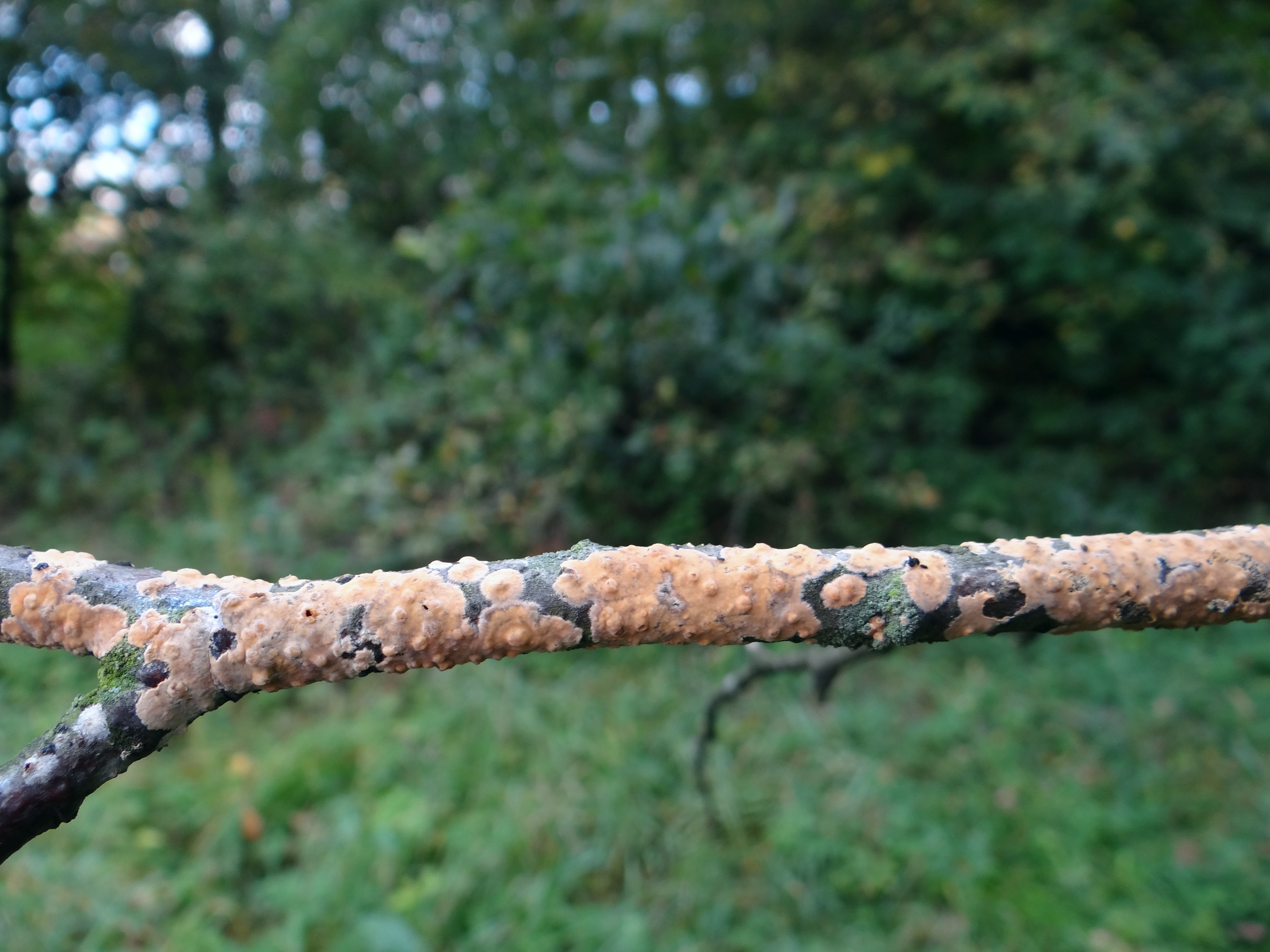

== Offsite ==
- BioNET-EAFRINET: Acacia mearnsii (Black Wattle)
- Mycobank: Cylindrobasidium laeve
- Scottish fungi: Cylindrobasidium laeve
