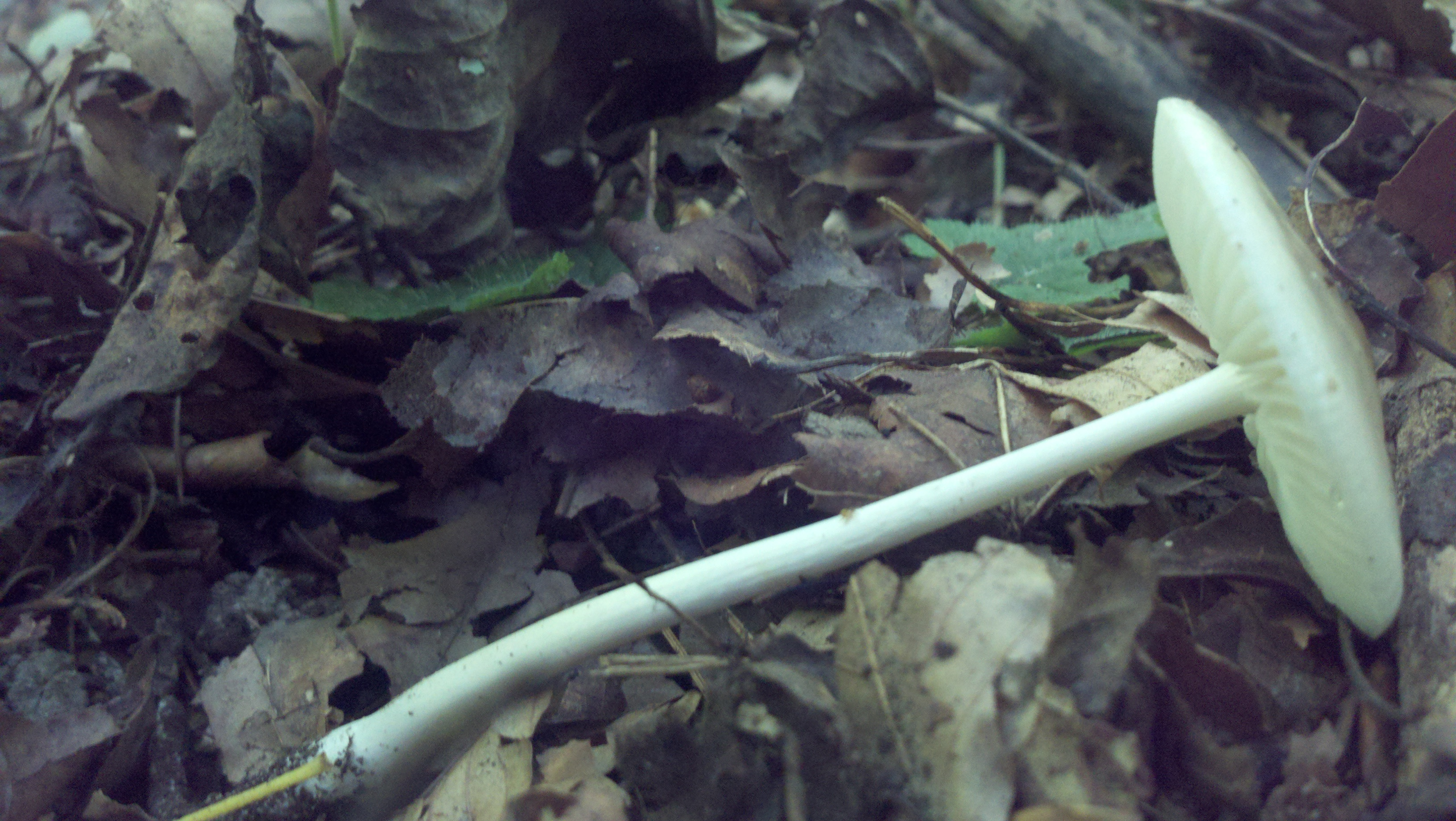

Scientific classification
- Domain: Eukaryota
- Kingdom: Fungi
- Division: Basidiomycota
- Class: Agaricomycetes
- Order: Agaricales
- Family: Physalacriaceae
- Genus: Xerula
- Species: X. megalospora

Binomial name
- Xerula megalospora (Clem.) Redhead, Ginns & Shoemaker (1987)

Synonyms
- Clitocybe megalospora Clem. (1896); Oudemansiella megalospora (Clem.) Zhu L.Yang, G.M.Muell., G.Kost & Rexer (2009)

= Xerula megalospora =

Species of fungus

Xerula megalospora Mycological characteristics
- Gills on hymenium
- Cap is convex or umbonate
- Hymenium is adnexed
- Stipe is bare
- Spore print is white
- Ecology is saprotrophic
- Edibility is edible

Xerula megalospora is a species of gilled mushroom in the family Physalacriaceae.

Xerula megalospora fruit bodies occur on the ground, solitarily or in small groups. They are saprobic and found near the well-decayed stumps of oak or other broadleaf trees. This species can grow up to 13 cm (5.1 in) high. The caps, 2–10 cm (0.8–3.9 in) across, can be a convex or umbonate shape eventually becoming flat and centrally depressed. The cap is viscid and colored smokey white to pale buff. Gills are adnate, white, and smooth. The flesh of Xerula megalospora is white, and the odor is sometimes described as being reminiscent of carrots. The stipe contains a root-like extension 8–12 cm (3.1–4.7 in) long. The spore print is white. The spores of this species are a distinguishing feature being a relatively large 18–23 by 11–14 μm. The botanical name megalospora means large-spored. The spore shape is citriniform (i.e., lemon shaped), the surface is finely roughened, and spores are non-amyloid. This species is widespread and fairly common in urban areas.

The species is edible although consists of little flesh.
