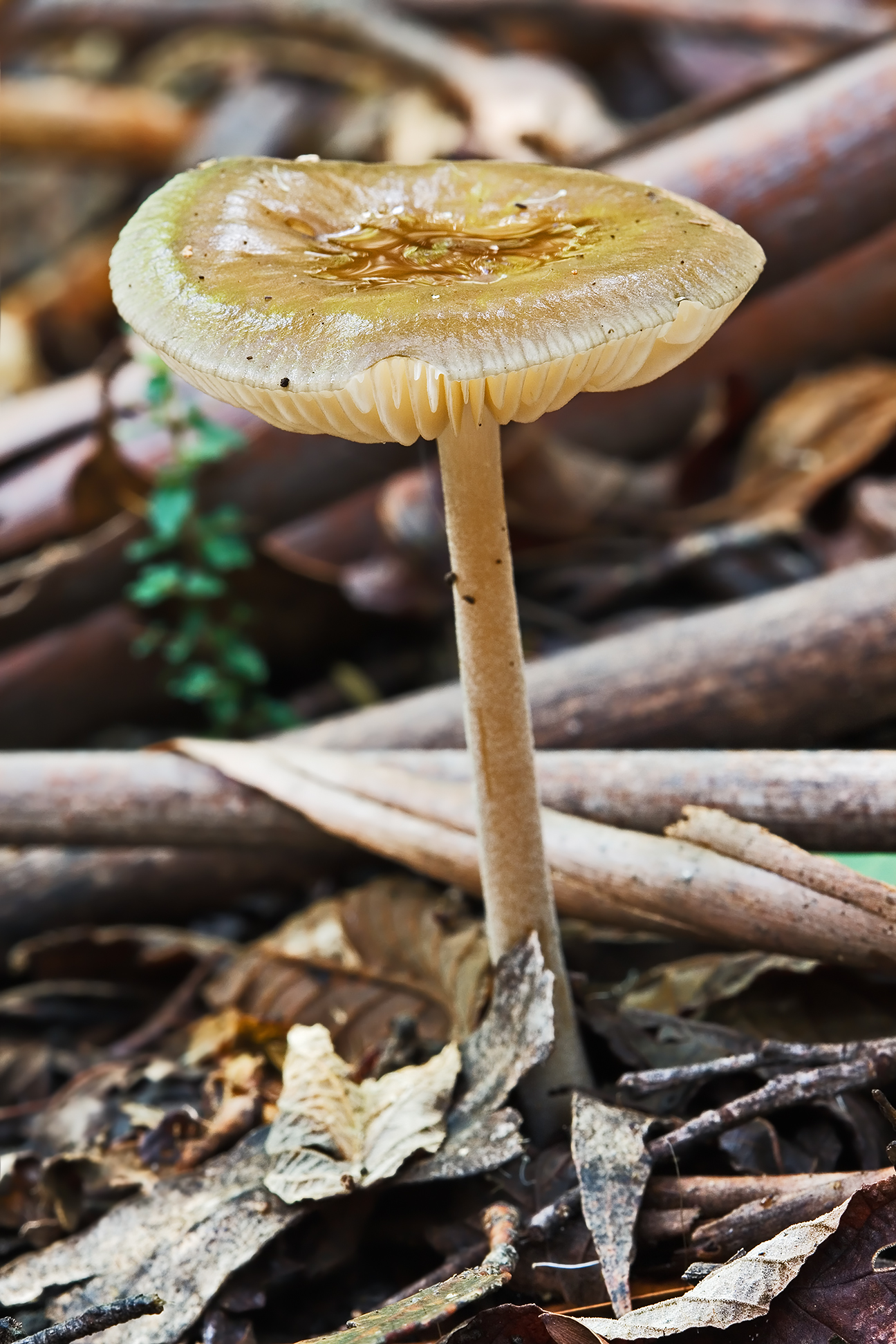

Scientific classification
- Domain: Eukaryota
- Kingdom: Fungi
- Division: Basidiomycota
- Class: Agaricomycetes
- Order: Agaricales
- Family: Physalacriaceae
- Genus: Xerula
- Species: X. australis

Binomial name
- Xerula australis (Dörfelt) R.H.Petersen (1994)

Synonyms
- Xerula radicata var. australis Dörfelt (1984); Oudemansiella radicata var. australis (Dörfelt) Pegler & T.W.K.Young (1987)

= Xerula australis =

Species of fungus

Xerula australis is a species of gilled mushroom in the family Physalacriaceae that is found in Australia. It was originally described in 1984 by German mycologist Heinrich Dörfelt.

== Description ==
The cap is 5 to 8 cm (2.0 to 3.1 in) in diameter, and brownish in color. The cap surface is moist, somewhat sticky, with conspicuous striations (grooves) at the margin. The gills have an adnate attachment to the stipe, are whitish in color, changing to buff in maturity, sometimes with a tinge of pink in older specimens. The whitish stipe is 8 to 11 cm (3.1 to 4.3 in) by 0.7 to 1.0 cm (0.3 to 0.4 in) thick, covered with small particles (furfuraceous) or small hairs (tomentose); the stipe bruises to a gray-tan color. Like other Xerula species, X. australis has a characteristic root-like rhizomorph that extends down in the soil, usually attached to rotting wood under the fruitbody. The spore print is white.

The spores are ellipsoid, smooth, and hyaline, with dimensions of 12–16 to 8–11 μm.

== Habitat and distribution ==
Xerula australis has been recorded growing singly or in groups on sandy soil in Southern Australia. Smith (2005) notes that in the Bunya Mountains of south-east Queensland, the fungus may be found fruiting in large groups on dead roots in the rainforest, but it is also associated with eucalypt forests and woodland.
