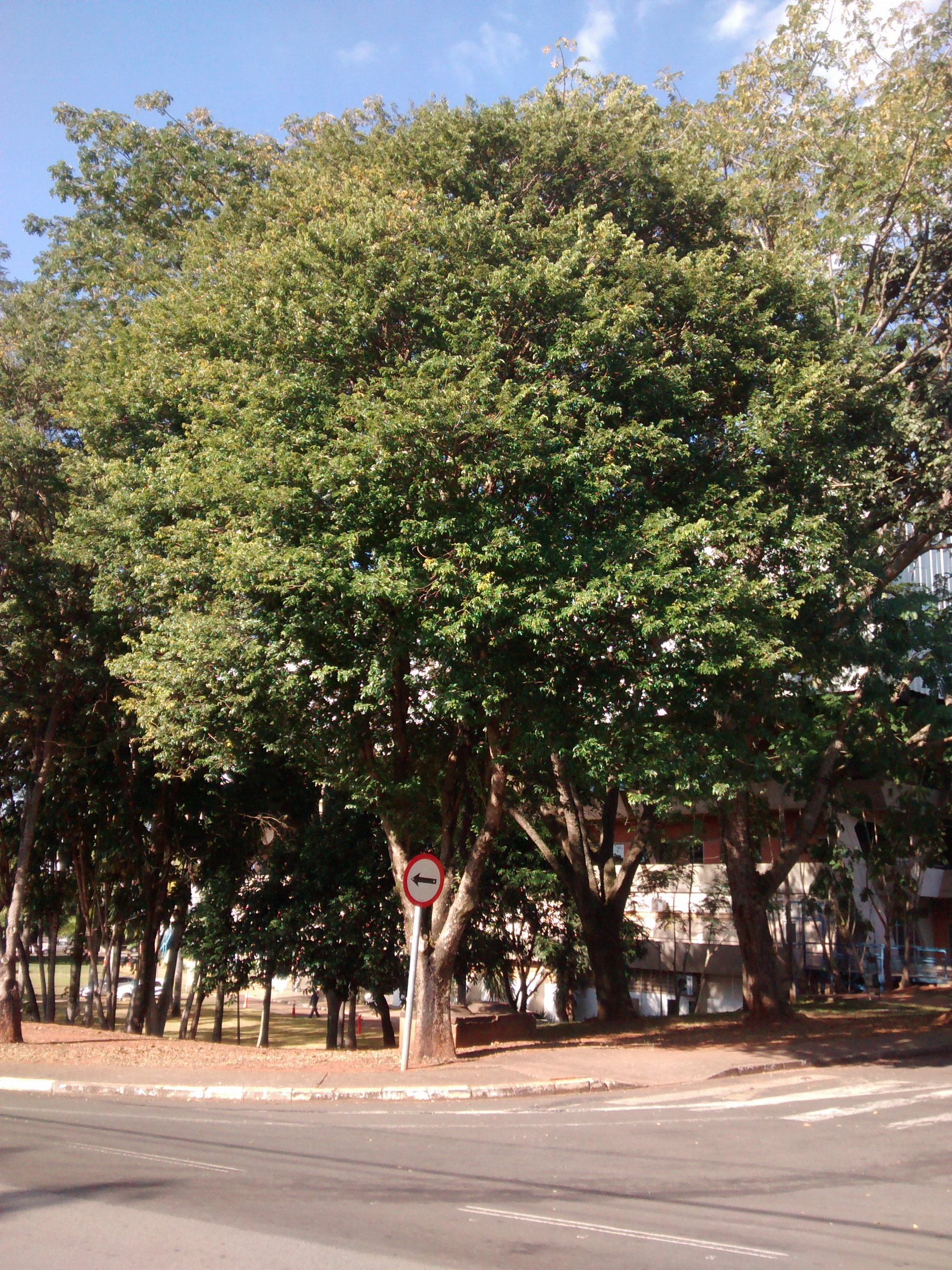
- Muellera campestris

Scientific classification
- Kingdom: Plantae
- Clade: Tracheophytes
- Clade: Angiosperms
- Clade: Eudicots
- Clade: Rosids
- Order: Fabales
- Family: Fabaceae
- Subfamily: Faboideae
- Tribe: Millettieae
- Genus: Muellera; L.f. (1782), nom. cons.

Species
- 32; see text

Synonyms
- Bergeronia Micheli (1883); Coublandia Aubl. (1775); Margaritolobium Harms (1923); Sphinctolobium Vogel (1837)

= Muellera =

Genus of legumes

Muellera is a genus of flowering plants in the family Fabaceae. It includes 32 species native to the tropical Americas, ranging from southern Mexico to northern Argentina. It belongs to the subfamily Faboideae.

- Muellera amazonica M.Sousa
- Muellera broadwayi (Urb.) M.Sousa
- Muellera burkartii M.Sousa
- Muellera campestris (Mart. ex Benth.) M.J.Silva & A.M.G.Azevedo
- Muellera chocoensis M.Sousa
- Muellera crucisrubierae (Pittier) M.Sousa
- Muellera denudata (Benth.) M.Sousa
- Muellera fendleri (Benth.) M.J.Silva & A.M.G.Azevedo
- Muellera fernandesii M.J.Silva & A.M.G.Azevedo
- Muellera filipes (Benth.) M.J.Silva & A.M.G.Azevedo
- Muellera fluvialis (Lindm.) Burkart
- Muellera fragiliflora M.J.Silva & A.M.G.Azevedo
- Muellera graciliflora (M.J.Silva, A.M.G.Azevedo & G.P.Lewis) M.J.Silva & A.M.G.Azevedo
- Muellera grazielae (M.J.Silva & A.M.G.Azevedo) M.J.Silva & A.M.G.Azevedo
- Muellera laticifera (M.J.Silva, A.M.G.Azevedo & G.P.Lewis) M.J.Silva & A.M.G.Azevedo
- Muellera leptobotrys M.J.Silva & A.M.G.Azevedo
- Muellera longiunguiculata (M.J.Silva & A.M.G.Azevedo) M.J.Silva & A.M.G.Azevedo
- Muellera lutea (J.R.Johnst.) M.J.Silva & A.M.G.Azevedo
- Muellera lutescens (Pittier) M.J.Silva & A.M.G.Azevedo
- Muellera monilis (L.) M.J.Silva & A.M.G.Azevedo
- Muellera montana (A.M.G.Azevedo ex M.J.Silva & A.M.G.Azevedo) M.J.Silva & A.M.G.Azevedo
- Muellera nitens M.J.Silva & A.M.G.Azevedo
- Muellera nudiflorens (Burkart) M.J.Silva & A.M.G.Azevedo
- Muellera obtusa (Benth.) M.J.Silva & A.M.G.Azevedo
- Muellera sanctae-marthae (Pittier) M.J.Silva & A.M.G.Azevedo
- Muellera sericea (Micheli) M.J.Silva & A.M.G.Azevedo
- Muellera torrensis (N.F.Mattos) M.J.Silva & A.M.G.Azevedo
- Muellera tozziana M.J.Silva
- Muellera tubicalyx (Pittier ex Poppend.) M.J.Silva & A.M.G.Azevedo
- Muellera unifoliolata (Benth.) M.Sousa
- Muellera variabilis (R.R.Silva & A.M.G.Azevedo) M.J.Silva & A.M.G.Azevedo
- Muellera virgilioides (Vogel) M.J.Silva & A.M.G.Azevedo
