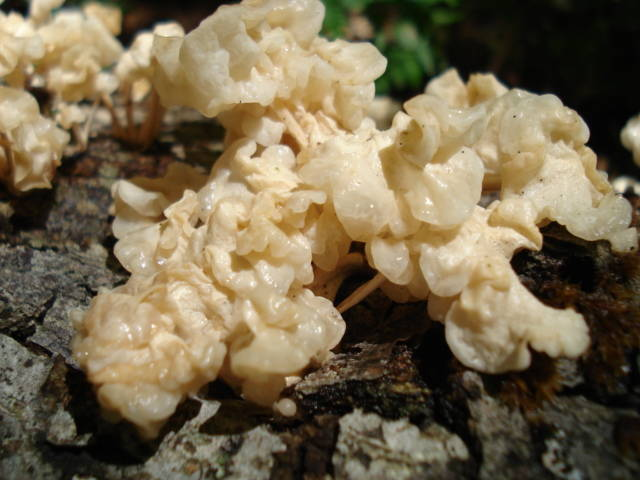
- Physalacria inflata

Scientific classification
- Domain: Eukaryota
- Kingdom: Fungi
- Division: Basidiomycota
- Class: Agaricomycetes
- Order: Agaricales
- Family: Physalacriaceae
- Genus: Physalacria; Peck (1882)

Type species
- Physalacria inflata (Schwein.) Peck (1882)

Synonyms
- Baumanniella Henn. (1897); Eoagaricus L.Krieg. (1923); Hormomitaria Corner (1950)

= Physalacria =

Genus of fungi

Physalacria is a genus of fungi in the family Physalacriaceae. The genus contains 30 species widely distributed in tropical regions of the Southern Hemisphere.

== Species ==
- Physalacria aggregata
- Physalacria andina
- Physalacria angustispora
- Physalacria australiensis
- Physalacria bambusae
- Physalacria brasiliensis
- Physalacria camerunensis
- Physalacria changensis
- Physalacria clusiae
- Physalacria concinna
- Physalacria corticola
- Physalacria cryptomeriae
- Physalacria decaryi
- Physalacria gillesii
- Physalacria indica
- Physalacria inflata
- Physalacria komabensis
- Physalacria lateriparies
- Physalacria macrocystidiata
- Physalacria maipoensis
- Physalacria moliniae
- Physalacria orientalis
- Physalacria orinocensis
- Physalacria pseudotropica
- Physalacria rugosa
- Physalacria sanctae-martae
- Physalacria sasae
- Physalacria solida
- Physalacria solomonensis
- Physalacria stilboidea
- Physalacria tenera
- Physalacria togoensis
- Physalacria villosa
- Physalacria vitis-idaeae
