= Mycoherbicide =

A mycoherbicide is a herbicide based on a fungus. As a biological agent, these "mycoherbicides... work by producing toxic compounds that dissolve the cell walls of targeted plants". Unlike traditional herbicides, mycoherbicides can reproduce themselves and linger in the soil for many years to destroy replanted crops.

== Commercial weed control products ==
These include:

- Alter naria destruens, to control dodder
- Chondrostereum purpureum, to control Prunus & Populus spp. in parts of Europe and Canada
- Colletotrichum acutatum, to control Silky hakea
- Colletotrichum gloeosporioides f. sp. aeschynomene: isolated from Northern joint vetch (Aeschynomene virginica) for rice & soybeans
- Cylindrobasidium laeve to control Acacia mearnsii (black wattle) in S. Africa
- Phytophthora palmivora: isolated from strangler vine (Morrenia odorata)
- Puccinia canaliculate, to control Yellow nutsedge
- Puccinia thalaspeos, to control Dyer's woad
- Sclerotinia minor, to control Dandelion

== Drug plants ==
In the United States House of Representatives, the Office of National Drug Control Policy Reauthorization Act of 2006 (H.R. 2829) passed with the inclusion of language to initiate research into the use of mycoherbicides against drug crops in foreign countries. In particular, the U.S. is considering using Fusarium oxysporum as a mycoherbicide against coca plants in Colombia. The United States Senate is currently drafting its own version of the bill.

== See also ==
- Bioherbicide
- Plan Colombia
