= Naiadolina =

Scientific classification
- Kingdom: Fungi
- Division: Basidiomycota
- Class: Agaricomycetes
- Order: Agaricales
- Family: Physalacriaceae
- Genus: Naiadolina; Redhead, H.Labbé & Ginns (2013)

Type species
- Naiadolina flavomerulina (Redhead) Redhead, H.Labbé & Ginns (2013)

Synonyms
- Marasmius flavomerulinus Redhead (1981)

Genus of fungi

Naiadolina is an agaric fungal genus that produces striking, yellowish fruit bodies on sedges (Scirpus and Dulichium) in wetlands in eastern Canada. The lamellae are merulioid, forked and anastomosing. The type species was previously classified as a Marasmius in the Marasmiaceae, but phylogenetically, Naiadolina flavomerulina is in the Physalacriaceae sister to the genus Cryptomarasmius.

== Etymology ==
The name Naiadolina is an allusion to the naiads or water nymphs in reference to the wetland habitat.
