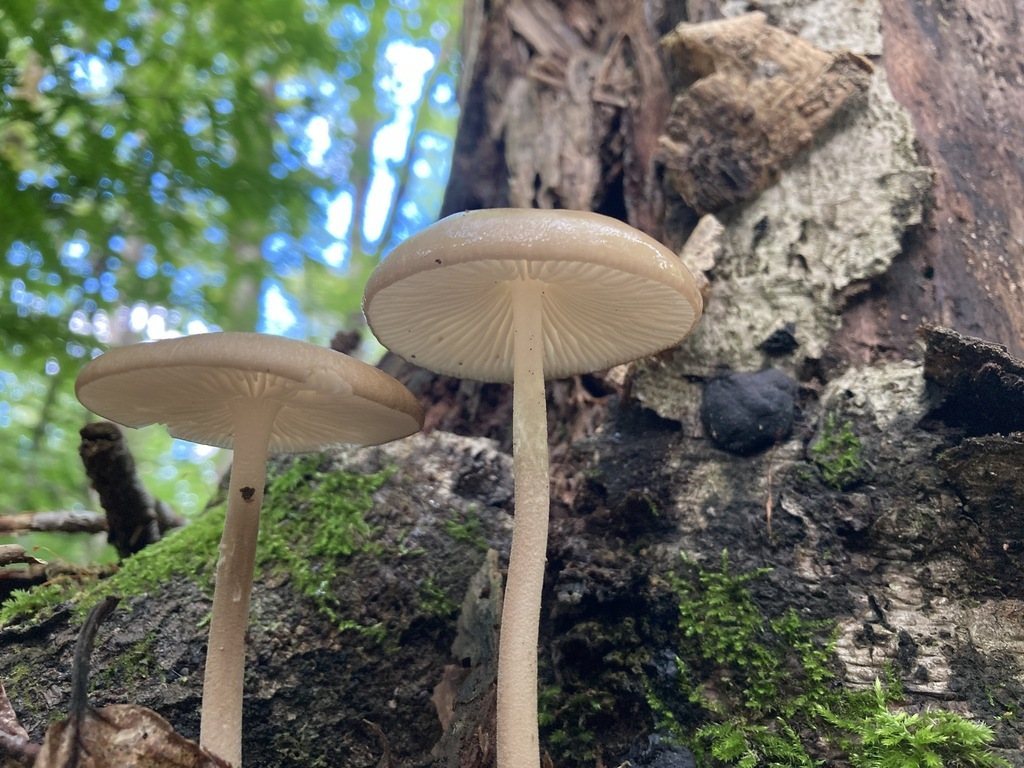

Scientific classification
- Kingdom: Fungi
- Division: Basidiomycota
- Class: Agaricomycetes
- Order: Agaricales
- Family: Physalacriaceae
- Genus: Hymenopellis
- Species: H. furfuracea

Binomial name
- Hymenopellis furfuracea (Peck) R.H. Petersen

Synonyms
- Collybia radicata var. furfuracea Peck; Oudemansiella furfuracea (Peck) Zhu L. Yang, G.M. Muell., G. Kost & Rexer; Oudemansiella radicata var. furfuracea (Peck) Pegler & T.W.K. Young; Xerula furfuracea (Peck) Redhead, Ginns & Shoemaker

= Hymenopellis furfuracea =

Species of mushroom

Hymenopellis furfuracea is a species of mushroom found in North America. It grows around dead wood.

== Description ==
The cap is brownish, darker near the center, and 2.5–11 centimetres (1–4 1/4 in) wide. The stem is 7–20 cm (3–8 in) long. The flesh is whitish and the spore print is white.

=== Similar species ===
Paraxerula americana is similar.

== Distribution and ecology ==
It is widely distributed in North America east of the Rocky Mountains.

It is found growing from the dead wood of hardwood trees, alone or in groups, occasionally on very well-decayed logs and stumps.

Adults of the pleasing fungus beetle Tritoma mimetica have been recorded from this mushroom, but unlike the relatives H.radicata and H.rugosoceps it does not seem to be a regular food source for them.
