= Joan Cribb =

Australian botanist and mycologist (1930–2023)

Joan Winifred Cribb OAM (née Herbert; 14 April 1930 – 17 October 2023) was an Australian botanist and mycologist.

== Life and career ==
Joan Winifred Herbert was born in Brisbane, Queensland, the daughter of botanists Vera and Desmond Herbert. She graduated from the University of Queensland with a Bachelor of Science with Honours and a Master of Science. She married fellow botanist Alan Cribb in 1954, and several years later joined him at the University of Queensland as a part-time lecturer and tutor.

Cribb specialised in gasteroid fungi, describing twenty-one new species in that group, as well as fourteen new species of marine fungi. For over 45 years Joan Cribb travelled over Queensland discovering and recording gasteromycetes. She and her husband also investigated algae-inhabiting fungi found in marine habitats and have recorded occurrences of freshwater fungi in Queensland waterways.

Cribb was awarded the Australian Natural History Medallion in 1994. In the 2020 Australia Day Honours she was awarded the Medal of the Order of Australia for "service to higher education as a botanist, and to the community".

Cribb died on 17 October 2023, at the age of 93.

The secotioid fungi genus Cribbea was named after her. Fungus species named after her include Hymenogaster cribbiae and Stephanospora cribbae.
