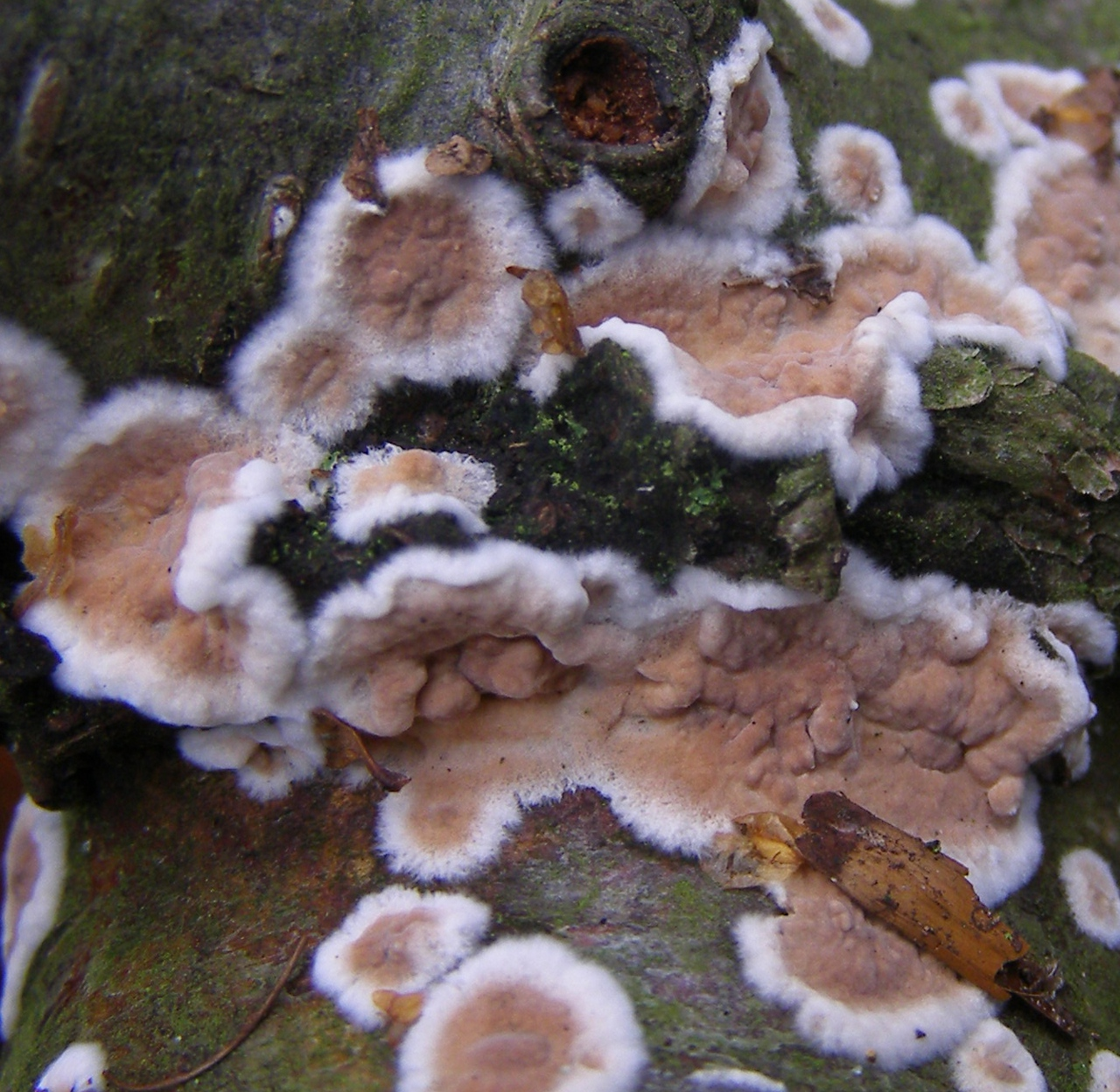
- Cylindrobasidium evolvens

Scientific classification
- Kingdom: Fungi
- Division: Basidiomycota
- Class: Agaricomycetes
- Order: Agaricales
- Family: Physalacriaceae
- Genus: Cylindrobasidium; Jülich (1974)

Type species
- Cylindrobasidium evolvens (Fr.) Jülich (1974)

Synonyms
- Thelephora subgen. Himantia Fr. (1821); Himantia (Fr.) Zoll. (1844)

= Cylindrobasidium =

Genus of fungi

Cylindrobasidium is a genus of corticioid fungi in the family Physalacriaceae. circumscribed by the Swiss mycologist Walter Jülich in 1974. As of June 2015, Index Fungorum lists eight species in the genus.

== Species ==
- Cylindrobasidium albulum
- Cylindrobasidium argenteum
- Cylindrobasidium corrugum
- Cylindrobasidium eucalypti
- Cylindrobasidium evolvens
- Cylindrobasidium laeve
- Cylindrobasidium parasiticum
- Cylindrobasidium torrendii
