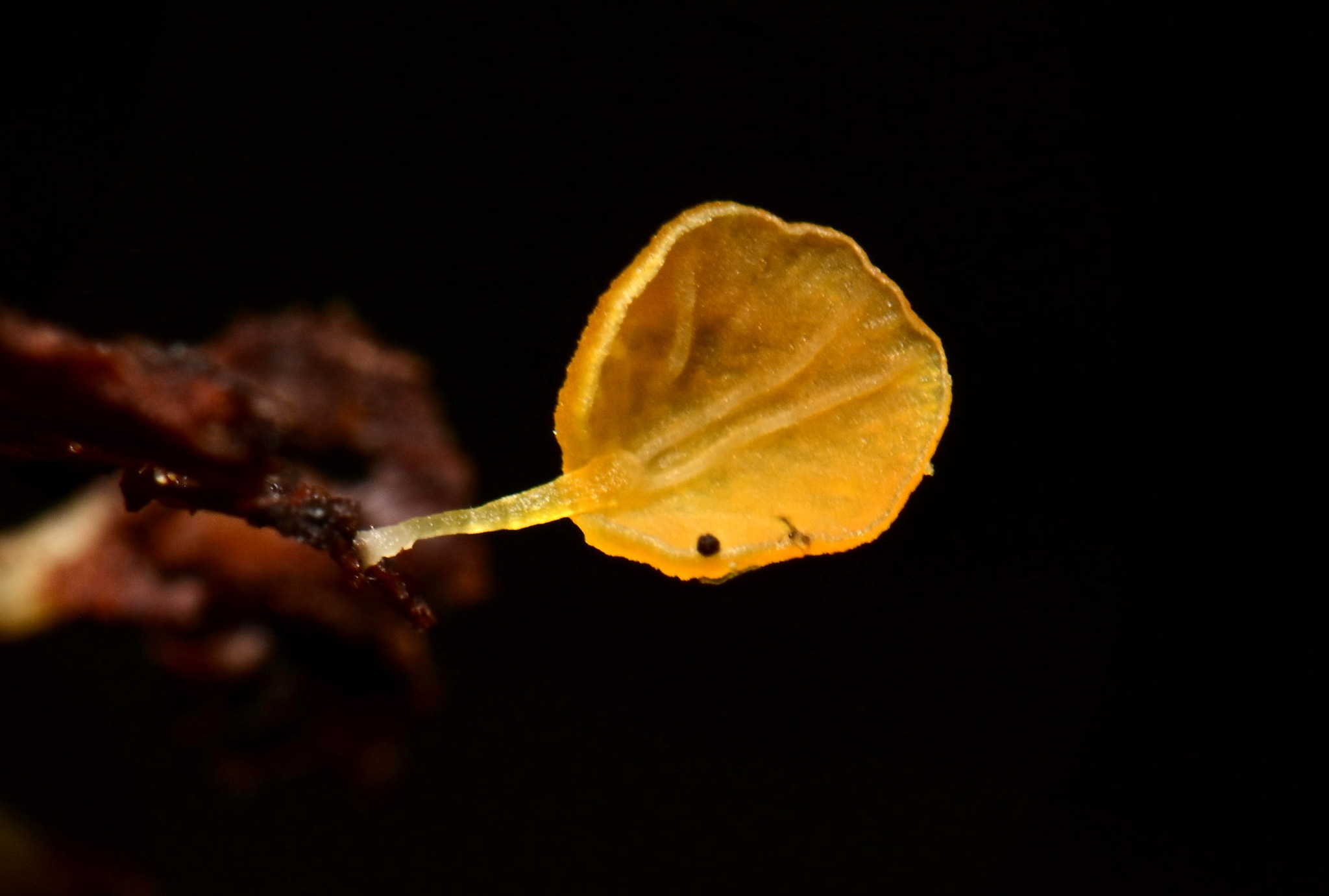

Scientific classification
- Kingdom: Fungi
- Division: Basidiomycota
- Class: Agaricomycetes
- Order: Agaricales
- Family: Physalacriaceae
- Genus: Gloiocephala
- Species: G. lutea

Binomial name
- Gloiocephala lutea Singer (1976)

= Gloiocephala lutea =

Species of fungus

Gloiocephala lutea is a species of fungus native to Ecuador. It was described as new to science by Rolf Singer in 1976.
