= Guyanagaster =

Scientific classification
- Kingdom: Fungi
- Division: Basidiomycota
- Class: Agaricomycetes
- Order: Agaricales
- Family: Physalacriaceae
- Genus: Guyanagaster; T.W. Henkel, M.E. Smith & Aime

Type species
- Guyanagaster necrorhizus T.W. Henkel, M.E. Smith & Aime

Genus of fungi

Guyanagaster is a genus of fungi in the family Physalacriaceae. The genus contains two wood-decaying sequestrate species Guyanagaster necrorhizus and Guyanagaster lucianii. The species, found in the neotropical rainforests of the Guiana Shield, was first described scientifically in 2010.
