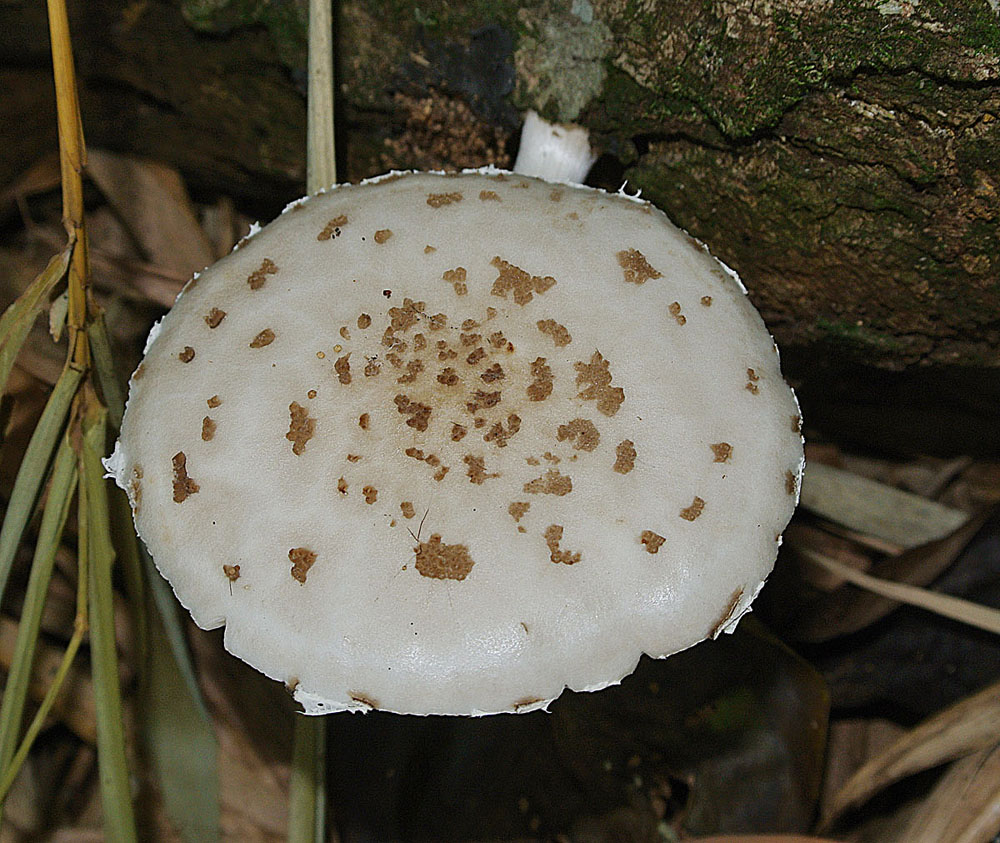

Scientific classification
- Domain: Eukaryota
- Kingdom: Fungi
- Division: Basidiomycota
- Class: Agaricomycetes
- Order: Agaricales
- Family: Physalacriaceae
- Genus: Oudemansiella
- Species: O. canarii

Binomial name
- Oudemansiella canarii (Jungh.) Höhn. (1909)

Synonyms
- Agaricus canarii Jungh. (1838); Amanitopsis canarii (Jungh.) Sacc. (1887)

= Oudemansiella canarii =

Species of fungus

Oudemansiella canarii is a species of gilled mushroom in the family Physalacriaceae. It is found in tropical America, southeast Asia, and Australia, where it grows as a saprotroph on hardwood logs.

== Taxonomy and phylogeny ==
This species does have two synonyms which are Agaricus canarii and Amanitopsis canarii, respectfully. One of the first people who described it was Franz Wilhelm Junghuhn, who was a German-Dutch mycologist and botanist. Additionally, Franz Xaver Rudolf von Hohnel, who was an Austrian mycologist, that, along with Franz Junghuhn, discovered O. Canarii in 1838. O. canarii was first found by the previously mentioned mycologists in an expedition they both undertook in Australia.

The group that this species belongs to is Oudemansiella. The scientific classification of O. canarii is that it is in the fungal division Basidiomycota, the class Agaricomycetes, the order Agaricales, the family Physalacriaceae, and the genus Oudemansiella. Some relatives of O. canarii are O. africana, O. chiangaiae, O. jponica, O. platensis, and many more species in the genus Oudemansiella. O. canarii has not been explicitly used in a molecular phylogenetic study, however, one major study was used to study and identify O. canarii in one of its natural biomes of South America, or more specifically, Argentina.

== Morphology ==
Oudemansiella canarii is a white, pilliate stipate mushroom that grows on fallen, decaying, and wet logs. Some of its determining features are its subdeccurent gill type and a piliate stipate stipe. This species of mushroom produces basidiospores. The cap of O. canarii is also has a determining feature of intact and ruptured warts on the cap.

The life cycle of O. canarii is similar to that of most Agaricales in the way that the primary mycelium produced by the germination of basidiospore is of short duration. It is haploid with septate hyphae. The cells contain oil globules, vacuoles and are short and uninucleate. As a result of hyphal fusions, the primary mycelium becomes binucleate usually without clamp connections rarely with clamp connections. The mycelium with binucleate cells is called secondary or dikaryotie mycelium. It is long-lived and abundant. It produces mushrooms year after year. The hyphae are long and branched. Commonly the hyphae interlace and twist to form thick, white hyphal cords called the rhizomorphs which bear the fruiting bodies.

== Ecology ==
This species gets its energy through being a saprobe of dead or decaying wood. Some other organisms that O. canarii can be associated with certain types of bacteria, such as Spirochaeta cytophaga, due their ability to break down cellulose. This relationship would be described as a commensalitic relationship due to the fact that the S. cytophaga helps break down the cellulose in the decaying or rotting wood which O. canarii uses for its nutrition. As previously stated, O. canarii is a saprobe of wood in the way that it feeds off of dead or decaying wood. The habitat that O. canarii can be readily found would be in tropical forests or forest that contain types of hardwood such as evergreen. These types of trees are commonly found in Tropical USA, Central and South America and some parts of Australia. The geographic distribution of O. canarii is concentrated mostly around the tropical areas such as that as previously stated, of Argentina, tropical Central and North America, with a smaller density located in North Australia.

== Overall biology and relevance for humans ==
Oudemansiella canarii is indeed economically important for humans because, like some agaric fungi, are edible. In a study by Turk Pharmacology, it was found that O. Canarii was found to have antioxidative properties. Additionally, the study yielded several bioactive and beneficial components such as “phenol, flavonoid, ascorbic acid, B-Carotene, and lycopene” (Acharya et al., 2019). These are all compounds that are beneficial to the human gastrointestinal tract. Throughout the range of O. canarii, it is found as a gastronomic delicacy. O. canarii has been well studied for its significant antimicrobial activities against C. albicans, C. glabrata, C. krusei, C. tropicalis and C. sphaerospermum (Acharya et al., 2019). The extract of O. canarii was shown to have antibacterial activity against the Gram positive bacterial pathogen, Staphylococcus aureus, but this cannot be explained by the presence of strobilurins, which are selective antifungal agents (Niego et al., 2021). Therefore, Oudemansielloid species could turn out to be a source of novel potent compounds with antimicrobial properties, once they have been studied more thoroughly.

In terms of cultural significance, there were no significant findings of O. canarii specifically (Acharya et al., 2019). Additionally, as previously stated, the significant use of O. canarii by humans is, along with many other agarics and Basidiomycota, is an edible delicacy. The previously mentioned study about the economical importance to humans also delved into the biochemistry and cellular biology of O. canarii (Acharya et al., 2019). It was found during the study that levels of acetonitrile and derivatives of phosphate were detected. Acetonitrile was found to be present in the processing of O. canarii and acetonitrile is beneficial to humans due to the fact that acetonitrile is a common ingredient in supplements that are used to break down saturated fatty acids and phosphates are used in the body to build and repair bones, help nerves, and help muscles to contract.
