= Alan Cribb =

Australian botanist and mycologist (1925–2026)

Alan Bridson Cribb (5 October 1925 – 17 October 2026) was an Australian botanist and mycologist and an expert in marine and freshwater algae and seaweeds. He also wrote on native and wild foods of Australia.The standard author abbreviation Cribb is used to indicate this person as the author when citing a botanical name.

== Early life ==
Alan Bridson Cribb was born in Ipswich, Queensland, on 5 October 1925, the son of the indentically named Alan Bridson Cribb, a grazier, and his wife, Dorothy Shand. He grew up around Longreach and his father instructed him in a love for the Australian bush and an interest in natural history. The extended Cribb family lived in Ipswich where the family business, the Cribb & Foote department store, was located.

Cribb studied at the University of Queensland, taking his BSc with first class honours in 1948. He collected algae on a science students excursion to Noosa Heads in 1948, and this collection was used to forward his future field of study. Queensland did not have any experts in algae at the time. Cribb travelled to New Zealand, where he studied under Val Chapman before moving into his honours program. He took up a position as a demonstrator in the Department of Botany and worked with visiting academic Tore Levring of Sweden studying marine algae on Heron Island. Cribb was appointed a research officer with the CSIRO's Division of Fisheries and Oceanography at Cronulla in 1950. He escorted Lily Newton, a British expert in seaweeds, when she came to Australia at the invitation of the CSIR (now the CSIRO) in 1950. Cribb spent two years reviewing algae, especially macrocystis from Tasmania. He returned to Queensland in 1952, taking up work as a botany lecturer at the University of Queensland. He took his PhD in 1958. He was head of the Department of Biology from 1978 to 1982 and remained in the department until his retirement in 1988.

== Extended research ==
Cribb's research continued into marine algae of southern Queensland and the Great Barrier Reef. He published over 135 papers and books. He also presented evidence to the 1973 Royal Commission into exploratory and production drilling for petroleum of the Great Barrier Reef. He and his wife also contributed on a report on the revegetation of South Stradbroke Island following sand mining activity in 1971. He participated in four expeditions of the Royal Geographical Society of Queensland. He prepared documentation on the distribution of flora in Queensland for use by staff of the National Parks & Wildlife Service. His work on the Great Barrier Reef established classification systems for algae of the intertidal reefs. He and his wife, researcher Joan Cribb, completed two volumes on bush and wild foods, with material from Desmond Herbert and notes from Raymond Specht's Arnhem Land Expedition of 1948.

== Personal life and death ==
Cribb married Joan Herbert (died 2023) in 1954. Together he and his wife, as Joan Cribb, published a number of books on marine fungi and wild foods.

Cribb died on 17 October 2026 at the age of 101.

== Memberships and awards ==
President and editor – Queensland Naturalists Club (twice)

Member – Australian Marine Sciences Association

Member – Australasian Society for Phycology and Aquatic Botany

Member – British Phycological Society

Member – American Phycological Society

Member – Indian Phycological Society

Member – Royal Society of Queensland

1997 – Queensland Natural History Award

2001 – Natural History Medallion

== Legacy ==
His taxonomic work included the identification of 24 algae, 14 marine fungi and 1 flowering plant. The algal herbarium he had established at the University of Queensland was transferred to the Queensland Herbarium and is central to that collection.
