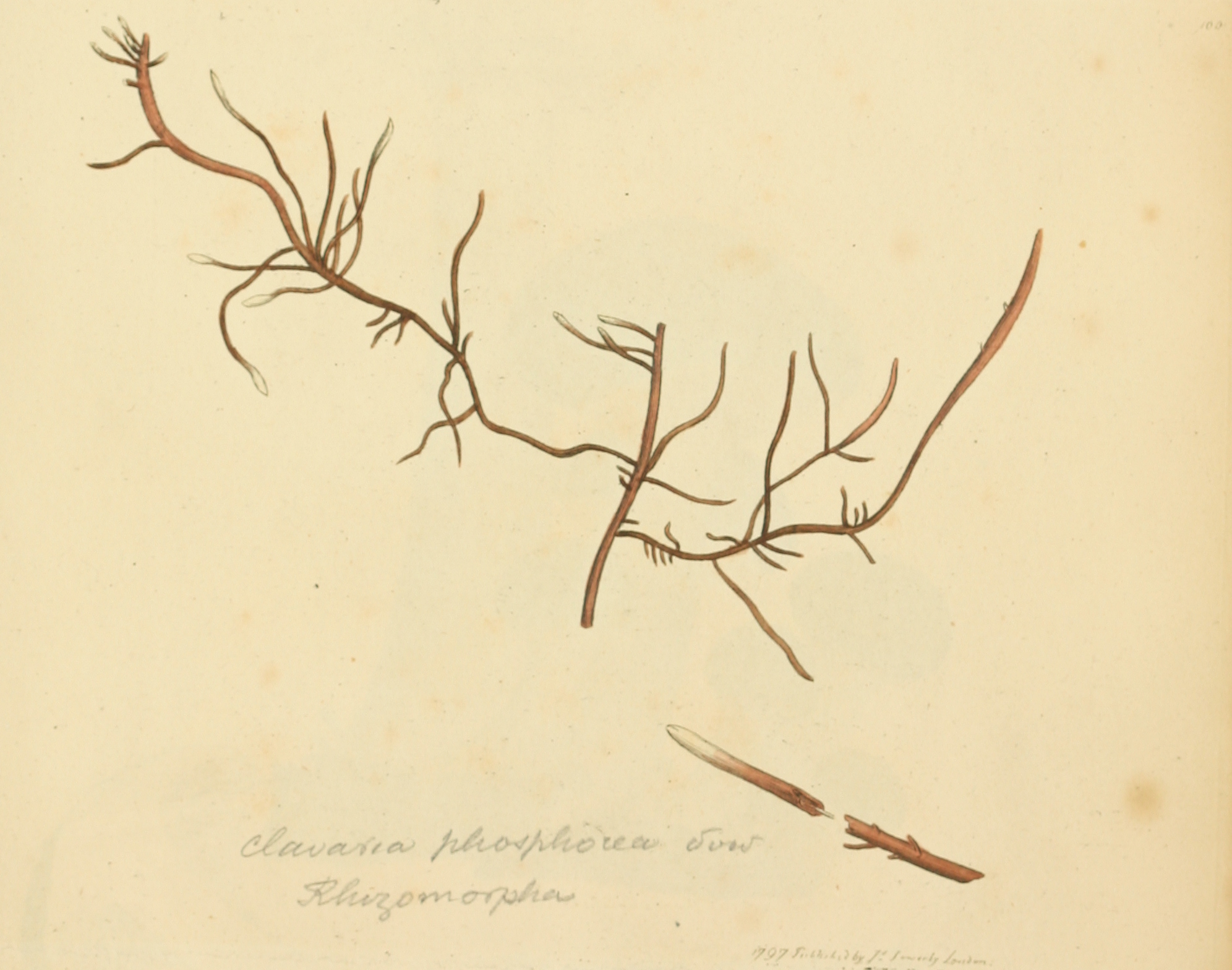
- Himantia umbrina

Scientific classification
- Kingdom: Fungi
- Division: Basidiomycota
- Class: Agaricomycetes
- Order: Agaricales
- Family: Physalacriaceae
- Genus: Himantia; Pers.

= Himantia =

Genus of fungi

Himantia is a genus of fungi in the mushroom family Physalacriaceae.
