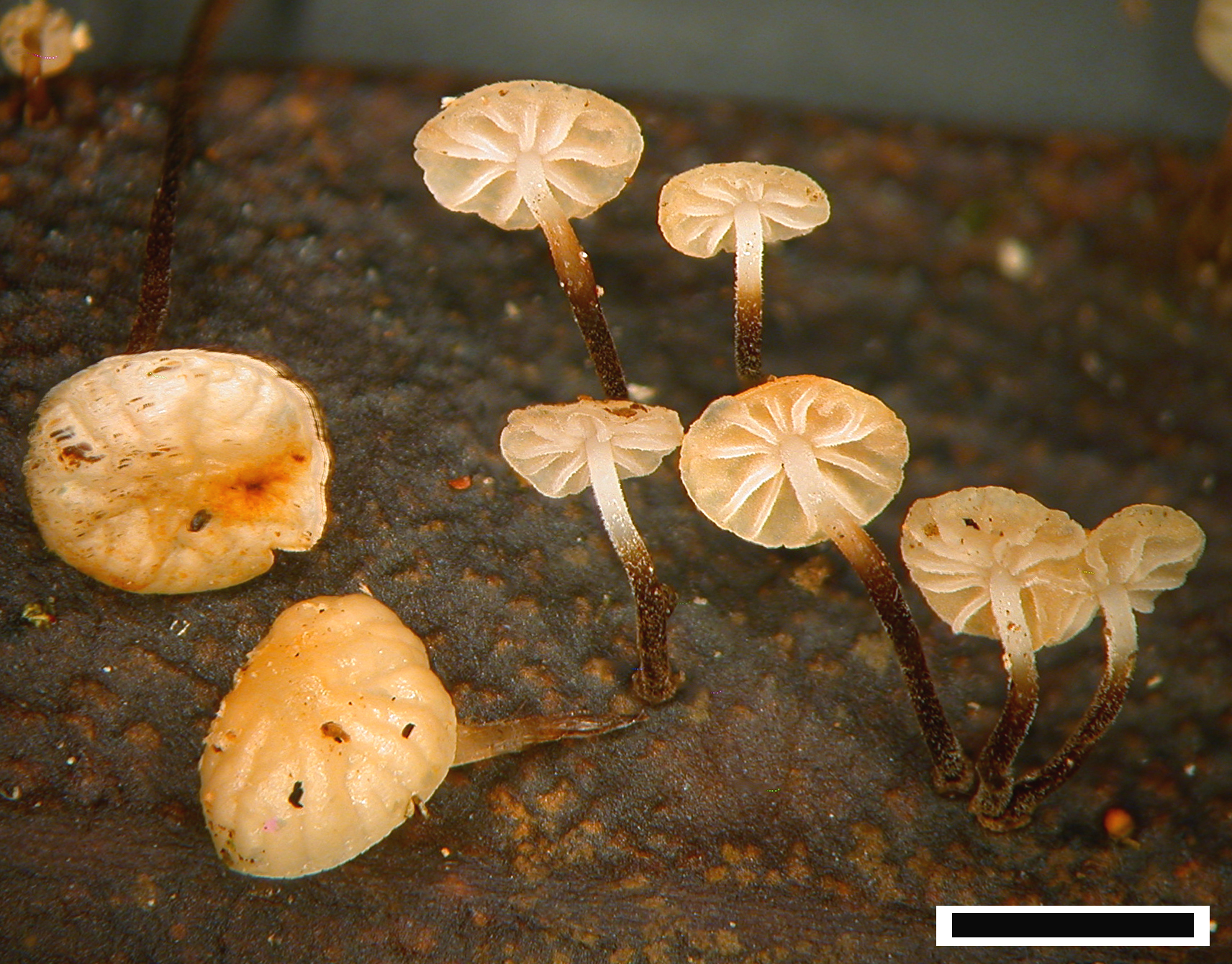
- Gloiocephala xanthocephala

Scientific classification
- Domain: Eukaryota
- Kingdom: Fungi
- Division: Basidiomycota
- Class: Agaricomycetes
- Order: Agaricales
- Family: Physalacriaceae
- Genus: Gloiocephala; Massee (1892)

Type species
- Gloiocephala epiphylla Massee (1892)

= Gloiocephala =

Genus of fungi

Gloiocephala is a genus of fungi in the family Physalacriaceae. The genus is widespread, though mainly known from tropical and sub-tropical areas, and contains about 30 species.

The mushrooms of this group are very small and grow on stems and leaves of monocotyledonous plants, such as sedges, usually in wet places. In most species their fruiting bodies do not develop into a typical mushroom form - the gills are often reduced to vein-like structures or completely missing, and the stipe may be asymmetrical, short or absent.

There are five species which grow in Europe: G. caricis, G. cerkesii, G. cornelii, G. menieri and G. pseudocaricis.

== Species ==
- Gloiocephala allomorpha
- Gloiocephala alvaradoi
- Gloiocephala amphibia
- Gloiocephala anastomosans
- Gloiocephala aquatica
- Gloiocephala capillata
- Gloiocephala caricis
- Gloiocephala cerkezii
- Gloiocephala ciliata
- Gloiocephala cinnamomea
- Gloiocephala confusa
- Gloiocephala cornelii
- Gloiocephala culmicola
- Gloiocephala epiphylla
- Gloiocephala gracilis
- Gloiocephala helisca
- Gloiocephala inobasis
- Gloiocephala lamellosa
- Gloiocephala longicrinita
- Gloiocephala longifimbriata
- Gloiocephala longisperma
- Gloiocephala lutea
- Gloiocephala menieri
- Gloiocephala mucrocystidiata
- Gloiocephala mycenoides
- Gloiocephala nothofagi
- Gloiocephala occidentalis
- Gloiocephala palmarum
- Gloiocephala phormiorum
- Gloiocephala podocarporum
- Gloiocephala pseudocaricis
- Gloiocephala quercetorum
- Gloiocephala quitensis
- Gloiocephala religiosa
- Gloiocephala resinopunctata
- Gloiocephala rubescens
- Gloiocephala sessilis
- Gloiocephala spathularia
- Gloiocephala tenuicrinita
- Gloiocephala tezae
- Gloiocephala tibiicystis
- Gloiocephala xanthocephala
- Gloiocephala zeylanica
