= Muellera lutea =

Conservation status
- Endangered (IUCN 3.1)

Scientific classification
- Kingdom: Plantae
- Clade: Tracheophytes
- Clade: Angiosperms
- Clade: Eudicots
- Clade: Rosids
- Order: Fabales
- Family: Fabaceae
- Subfamily: Faboideae
- Genus: Muellera
- Species: M. lutea

Binomial name
- Muellera lutea (J.R.Johnst.) M.J.Silva & A.M.G.Azevedo (2012)

Synonyms
- Gliricidia lutea J.R.Johnst. (1905); Margaritolobium luteum (J.R.Johnst.) Harms (1923)

Genus of legumes

Muellera lutea is a species of flowering plant in the pea family (Fabaceae). It is a tree native to Isla de Margarita in the Venezuelan Antilles and the Araya Peninsula of northwestern Venezuela. It grows in tropical dry scrub and forest from 50 to 400 meters elevation.
