= Vince Briganti =

Football player and manager (born 1947)

Personal information
- Full name: Vincenzo Briganti
- Date of birth: 5 January 1947 (age 79)
- Place of birth: Terni, Italy

Youth career
- 1961–1972: KFC Winterslag

Senior career*
Years	Team	Apps	(Gls)
1972–1976	KFC Winterslag		
1977–1978	White Star Beverst (player-trainer)		

Managerial career
- 1977–1978: White Star Beverst (player-trainer)
- 1978–1979: KFC Winterslag
- 1981–1982: KFC Winterslag
- ?–?: K.S.C. Hasselt
- ?–?: Bilzen VV
- 1987–1988: KFC Winterslag
- 1989–1990: KFC Zwarte Leeuw
- 1990–1991: K. Stade Leuven
- 1991–1996: Genk (youth coordinator)
- 1999–2002: Belgium (assistant trainer)
- 2004–2006: Sint-Truidense V.V. (assistant trainer)
- * Club domestic league appearances and goals

Vincenzo "Vince" Briganti (born 5 January 1947) is an Italo-Belgian former football player and manager.

== Personal life ==
Four years after his birth in Terni, Italy, Vince Briganti's father moved to Belgium to find work in the mining area. One year later also the rest of the family moved to Genk.

Briganti is married and became father of two sons, Fabrizio and Lorenzo.

== Career ==
In the 1970s Briganti played for third-tier team KFC Winterslag. In that period Robert Waseige was trainer of the club from Belgian Limburg. In a couple of years, the club promoted from Third to First Division.

Afterwards he achieved a trainer's certificate and became Waseige's assistant trainer at Winterslag. Later hij also became head coach of the club multiple times, often after another trainer was fired. After a couple of years at Winterslag Briganti trained the first teams of the clubs KSC Hasselt, Bilzerse VV, KFC Zwarte Leeuw and K. Stade Leuven.

After a short career as trainer Briganti became football teacher at Bloso. He combined that function with scouting tasks for Waseige, who assigned him as his assistant for the Belgium national team. In 2001, he even became the factual trainer of the Belgian Red Devils for a friendly match against Czech Republic (a 1–1 draw) as stand-in for Waseige who underwent heart surgery; he trained the outfield players while Jacky Munaron trained the goalkeepers. With Briganti as assistant trainer, Belgium reached the second stage at the 2002 FIFA World Cup. Later, he also became Marc Wilmots's assistant for a short time with Sint-Truidense V.V.
