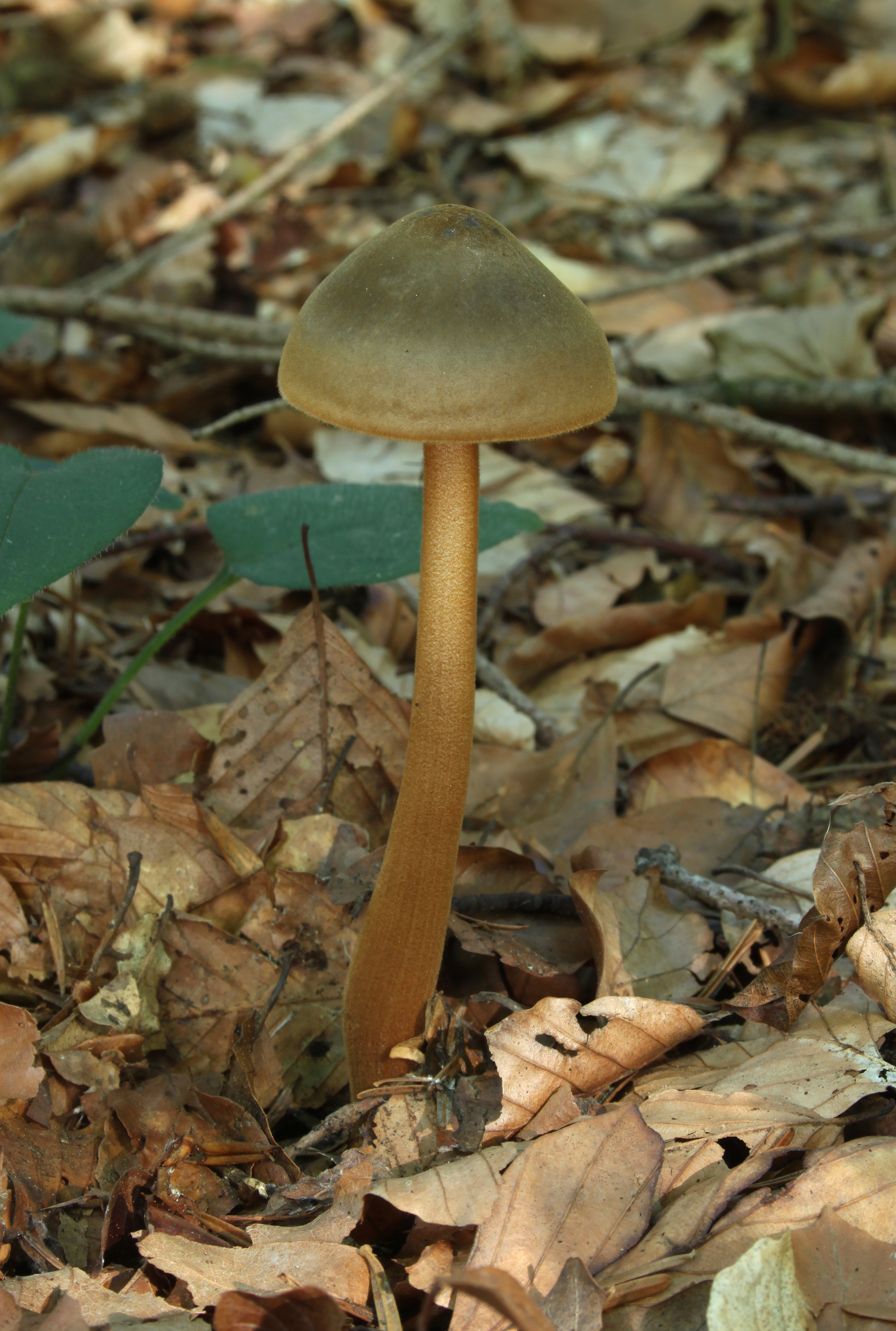
- Xerula pudens

Scientific classification
- Kingdom: Fungi
- Division: Basidiomycota
- Class: Agaricomycetes
- Order: Agaricales
- Family: Physalacriaceae
- Genus: Xerula; Maire

Type species
- Xerula longipes (P. Kumm.) Maire

= Xerula =

Genus of fungi

Xerula is a genus of gilled mushrooms in the family Physalacriaceae.

This genus has been recorded as a favored food of adults of the pleasing fungus beetle Tritoma mimetica, but the mushroom species in question might today be placed in Hymenopellis which contains the favorite food of adult T.mimetica.

== Species ==
- Xerula americana
- Xerula amygdaliformis
- Xerula asprata
- Xerula aureocystidiata
- Xerula australis
- Xerula caussei
- Xerula chiangmaiae
- Xerula fraudulenta
- Xerula furfuracea (Note: Edible)
- Xerula globospora
- Xerula hispida
- Xerula hongoi
- Xerula hygrophoroides
- Xerula incognita
- Xerula japonica
- Xerula kuehneri
- Xerula limonispora
- Xerula longipes
- Xerula mediterranea
- Xerula megalospora
- Xerula oreina
- Xerula orientalis
- Xerula pseudoradicata
- Xerula pudens
- Xerula raphanipes
- Xerula renati
- Xerula rubrobrunnescens
- Xerula rugosoceps
- Xerula setulosa
- Xerula sinopudens
- Xerula subnigra
- Xerula vinocontusa
- Xerula xeruloides
