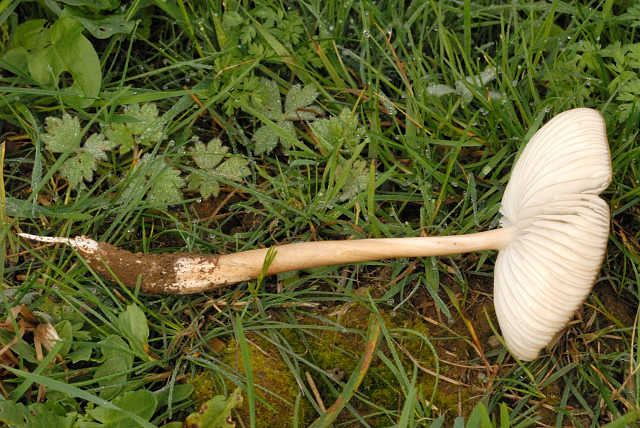

Scientific classification
- Kingdom: Fungi
- Division: Basidiomycota
- Class: Agaricomycetes
- Order: Agaricales
- Family: Physalacriaceae
- Genus: Hymenopellis
- Species: H. radicata

Binomial name
- Hymenopellis radicata (Relhan) Dörfelt

Synonyms
- Xerula radicata; Oudemansiella radicata

= Hymenopellis radicata =

Species of fungus

Hymenopellis radicata
- Mycological characteristics
- Gills on hymenium
- Cap is flat or umbonate
- Stipe is bare
- Spore print is white
- Ecology is saprotrophic
- Edibility is edible

Hymenopellis radicata, commonly known as the deep root mushroom, beech rooter, or the rooting shank, is a widespread agaric readily identified by its deeply rooted stalk (stipe).

== Description ==
The cap is medium to large, flat, grayish or yellowish brown and streaked, with a central hump and between 2.5 and 12 centimetres (1 and 4 3/4 in) wide. The surface of the cap is sticky or slimy when moist, with the underside displaying wide white gills, or lamellae. The brittle stalk tapers at both ends and is nearly white above to brown below the soil.

The stem grows into a long deeply rooting tap root until it touches a piece of wood. This may grow up to 25 cm in length in some specimens.

=== Similar species ===
It is similar to Oudemansiella longipes.

== Ecology and uses ==
This species has been recorded as a favored food of adults of the pleasing fungus beetle Tritoma mimetica; remarkably, for the larval of this beetle it seems to be deadly. The related T.atriventris has also been recorded from this mushroom, but it does not seem to be a regular food source for that beetle species.

The caps are reportedly edible by humans.
