= Dactylosporina =

Scientific classification
- Kingdom: Fungi
- Division: Basidiomycota
- Class: Agaricomycetes
- Order: Agaricales
- Family: Physalacriaceae
- Genus: Dactylosporina (Clémençon) Dörfelt (1985)

Type species
- Dactylosporina steffenii (Rick) Dörfelt (1985)

Species
- D. brunneomarginata D. cephalocystidiata D. glutinosa D. kuehneri D. macracantha D. steffenii

Synonyms
- Oudemansiella sect. Dactylosporina (Clémençon) Pegler & T.W.K.Young (1987); Oudemansiella subgen. Dactylosporina Clémençon (1979)

Genus of fungi

Dactylosporina is a genus of fungi in the family Physalacriaceae. D. brunneomarginata, the first representative of the genus found in Asia, was added to Dactylosporina in 2015.
