= Marco Briganti =

Italian footballer

Personal information
- Date of birth: 6 May 1982 (age 44)
- Place of birth: Città di Castello, Italy
- Height: 1.81 m (5 ft 11 in)
- Position: Centre-back

Team information
- Current team: Bastia

Senior career*
Years	Team	Apps	(Gls)
2001–2002	Rondinella	23	(0)
2002–2003	Sansepolcro	22	(2)
2003–2004	Chiusi	28	(3)
2004–2005	Imolese	34	(1)
2005–2006	Forlì	27	(0)
2006–2007	Sansovino	27	(0)
2007–2008	Pistoiese	22	(0)
2008–2014	Gubbio	88	(3)
2014–2015	Monza	29	(0)
2015–2016	Cremonese	36	(0)
2016–2017	Como	33	(0)
2017–2018	Santarcangelo	34	(1)
2018–2019	Vis Pesaro	33	(0)
2019–	Bastia	17	(0)
- * Club domestic league appearances and goals as of 14:15, 8 February 2020 (UTC)

Marco Briganti (born 6 May 1982) is an Italian footballer who plays for A.C. Bastia 1924 in Serie D.

== Biography ==
Born in Città di Castello, Umbria, Briganti started his career at Serie C2 team Rondinella. He then spent 2 seasons in Serie D before signed by Imolese. After 3 seasons in Serie C2, for Imolese, Forlì and Sansovino, he was signed by Serie C1 team Pistoiese. In the next season he terminated the contract with Pistoiese and signed by Gubbio and winning the promotion play-off in 2010 and again in 2011, promoted form the Seconda Divisione to Serie B. He signed for Monza in January 2014. In January 2015 he was signed by Cremonese.
