= Vincenzo Briganti =

Italian botanist (1766–1836)

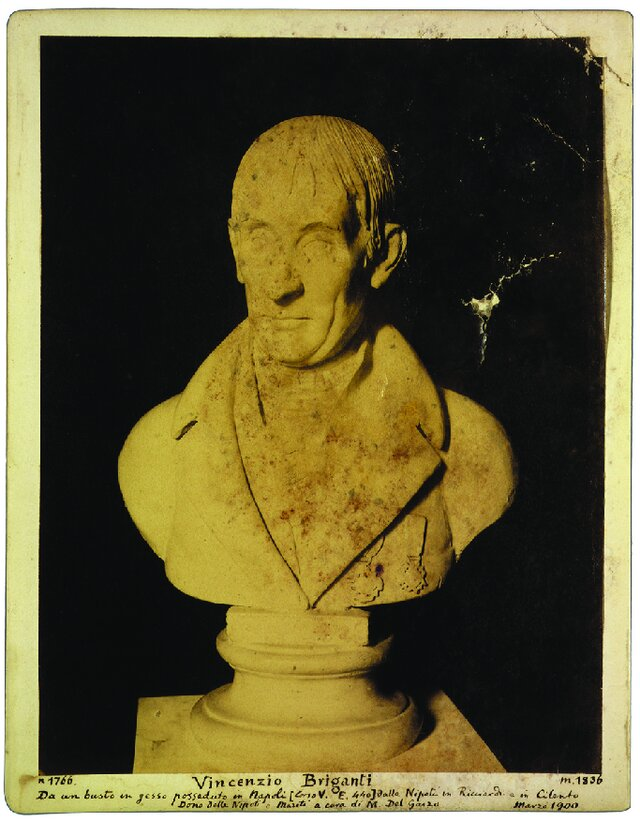
Bust of Briganti

Vincenzo Briganti (7 June 1766 – 5 April 1836) was an Italian medical doctor, naturalist, and mycologist. He served as a professor of materia medica at the University of Naples.

Briganti was born in Salvitelle, Salerno to Gennaro Briganti and Laura Grassi. He studied philosophy and natural science at Salerno. He then went to study medicine at Naples and received a degree in 1789. He however was interested in the natural sciences and began to travel and collect specimens of plants and insects. Among his early works was a promotion of the Linnean system. In 1809 he became a professor of medical botany at the University of Naples and began to collect plants of medical value. He wrote a book on the fungi which was published posthumously in 1848, "Historia fungorum Regni Neapolitani", edited by his son Francesco. Apart from plants and fungi, he also examined and described molluscs.

The genus Brigantiella was named after him by Pier Andrea Saccardo. Briganti's collections of plants was acquired by Orazio Comes.
