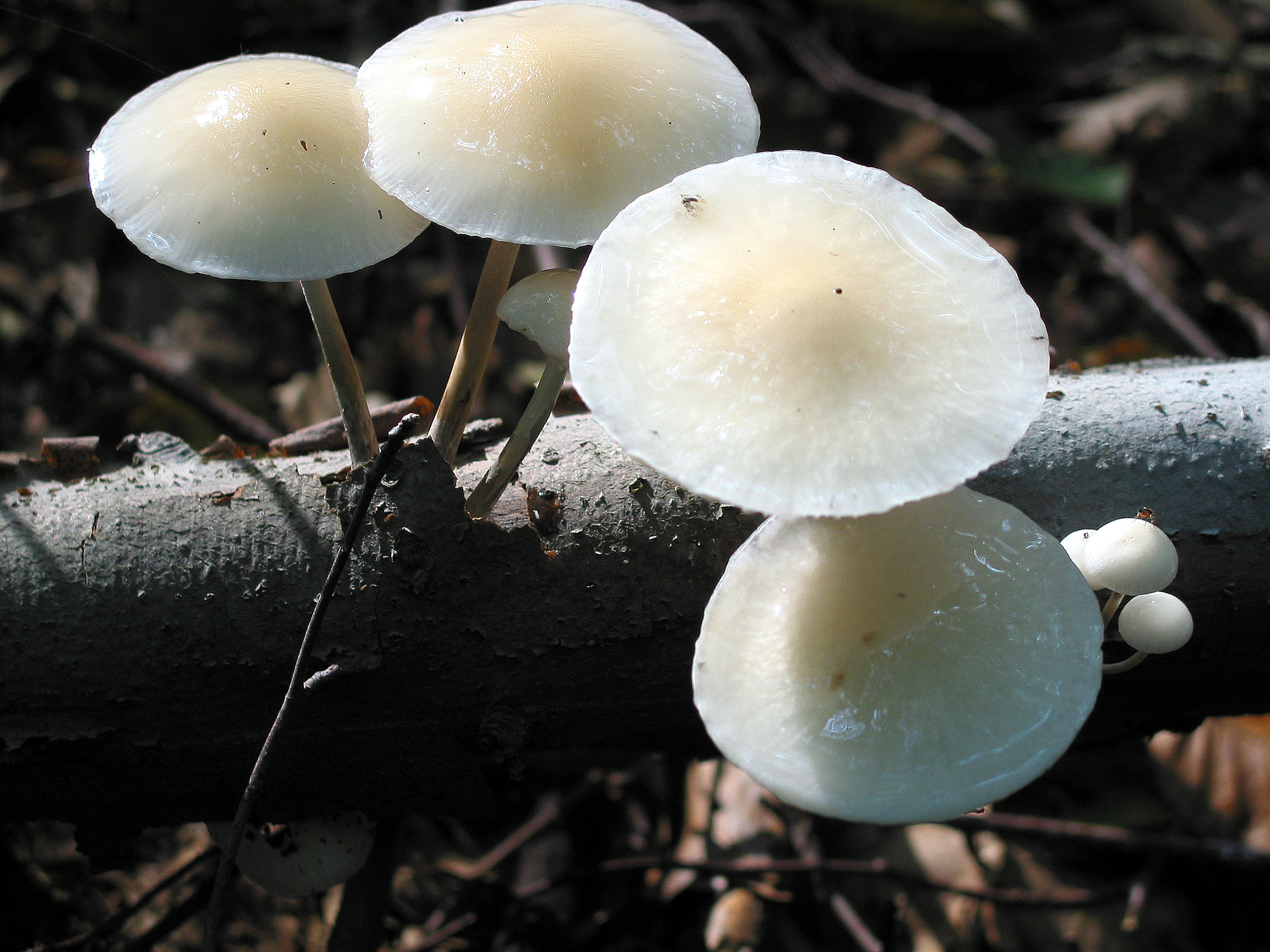
- Oudemansiella mucida

Scientific classification
- Kingdom: Fungi
- Division: Basidiomycota
- Class: Agaricomycetes
- Order: Agaricales
- Family: Physalacriaceae
- Genus: Oudemansiella; Speg. (1881)

Type species
- Oudemansiella platensis (Speg.) Speg. (1881)

Synonyms
- Mucidula Pat. (1887); Phaeolimacium Henn. (1899); Oudemansiella sect. Mucidula (Pat.) Zhu L.Yang, Li F.Zhang, G.M.Muell., G.Kost & Rexer (2009)

= Oudemansiella =

Genus of fungi

Oudemansiella is a genus of fungi in the family Physalacriaceae. The genus contains about 15 species that are widely distributed in tropical and temperate regions.

"Oudemansiella" has historically been listed as food for several animals, such as the pleasing fungus beetle Tritoma mimetica. However, old records often actually refer to species now placed into other genera of Physalacriaceae, and may not always be determinable today.

== Taxonomy ==
Yang and colleagues revised the genus in a 2009 publication, describing several new species and several varieties. They classified species in the genus into four sections based on the structure of the cap cuticle: Oudemansiella, Mucidula, Dactylosporina, and Radicatae.

The genus name of Oudemansiella is in honour of Corneille Antoine Jean Abram Oudemans (1825–1906), who was a Dutch botanist and physician who specialized in fungal systematics.

The genus was circumscribed by Carlo Luigi Spegazzini in 1881.

=== Species ===
- O. africana
- O. alveolata
- O. atrocaerulea
- O. aureocystidiata
- O. australis
- O. bii
- O. bispora
- O. caulovillosa
- O. canarii
- O. chiangmaiae
- O. colensoi
- O. crassibasidiata
- O. eradicata
- O. flavo-olivacea
- O. furfuracea
- O. gigaspora
- O. globospora
- O. incognita
- O. japonica
- O. kenyae
- O. latilamellata
- O. limonispora
- O. macracantha
- O. mammicystis
- O. megalospora
- O. melanotricha
- O. mucida
- O. mundroola
- O. orientiradicata
- O. platensis
- O. rhodophylla
- O. rubrobrunnescens
- O. rugosoceps
- O. semiglabripes
- O. sinopudens
- O. steffenii
- O. subinucida
- O. superbiens
- O. tetrasperma
- O. trichofera
- O. variabilis
- O. vinocontusa

== Gallery ==
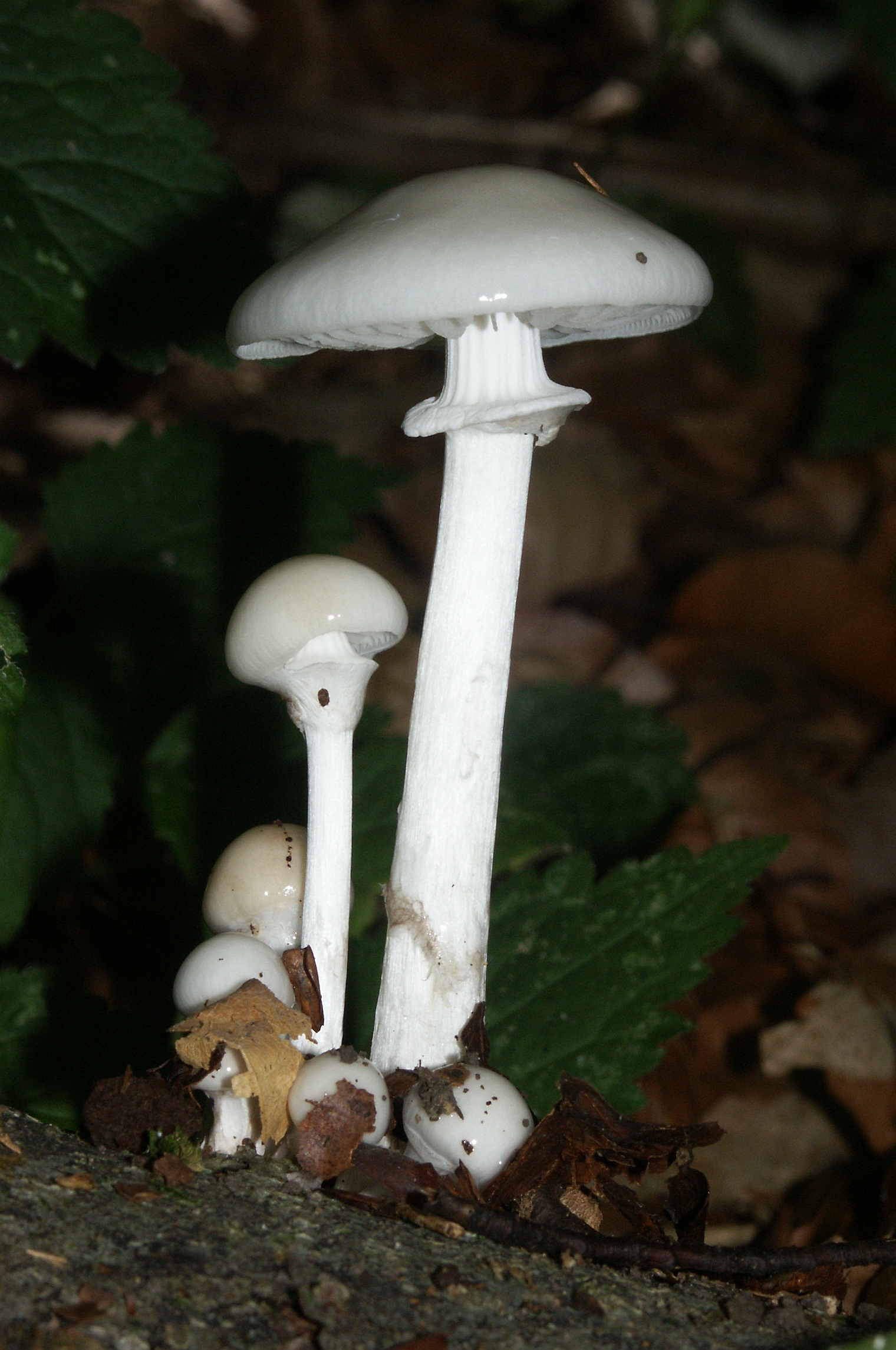
O. mucida, Germany

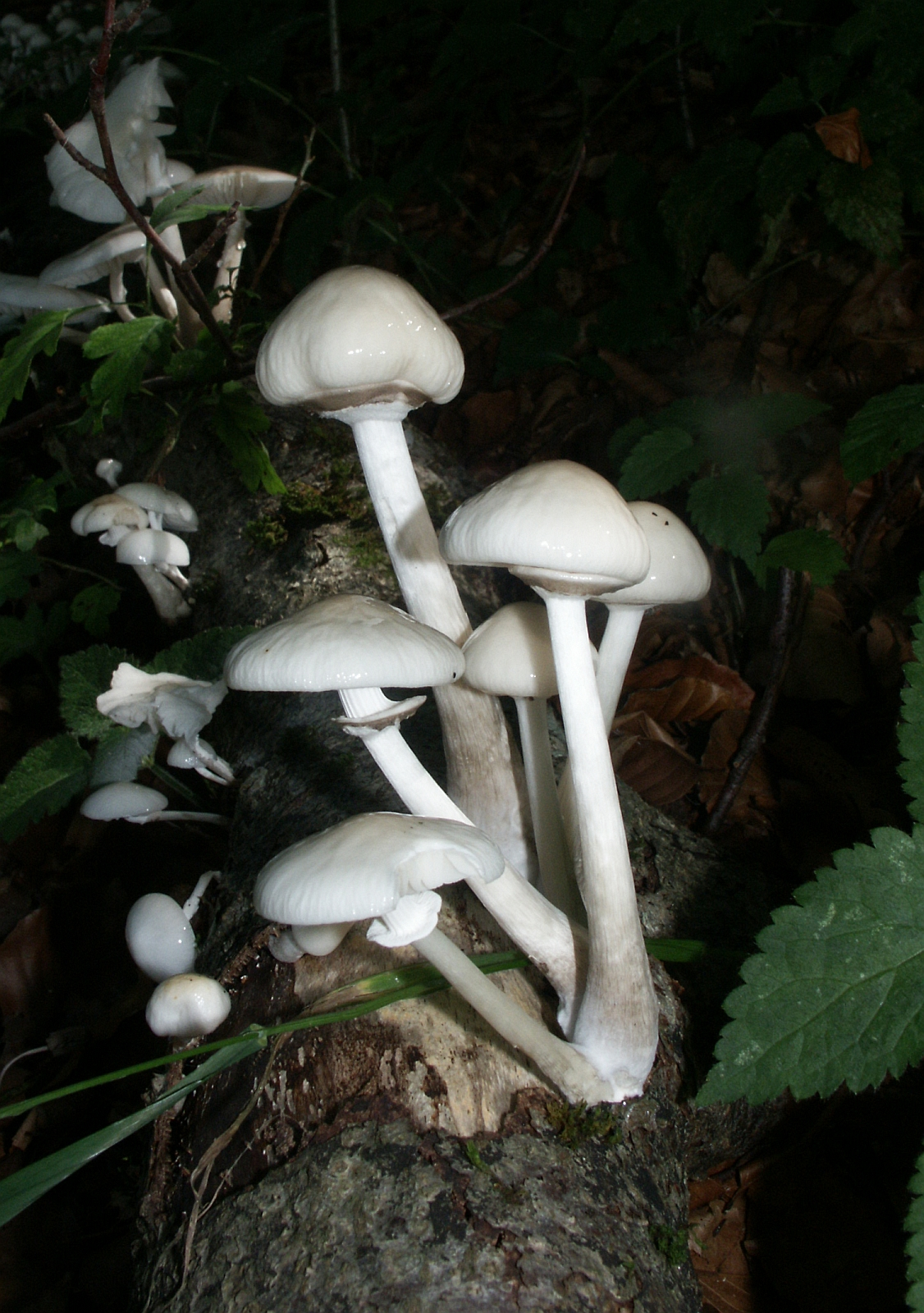
O. mucida, Germany
