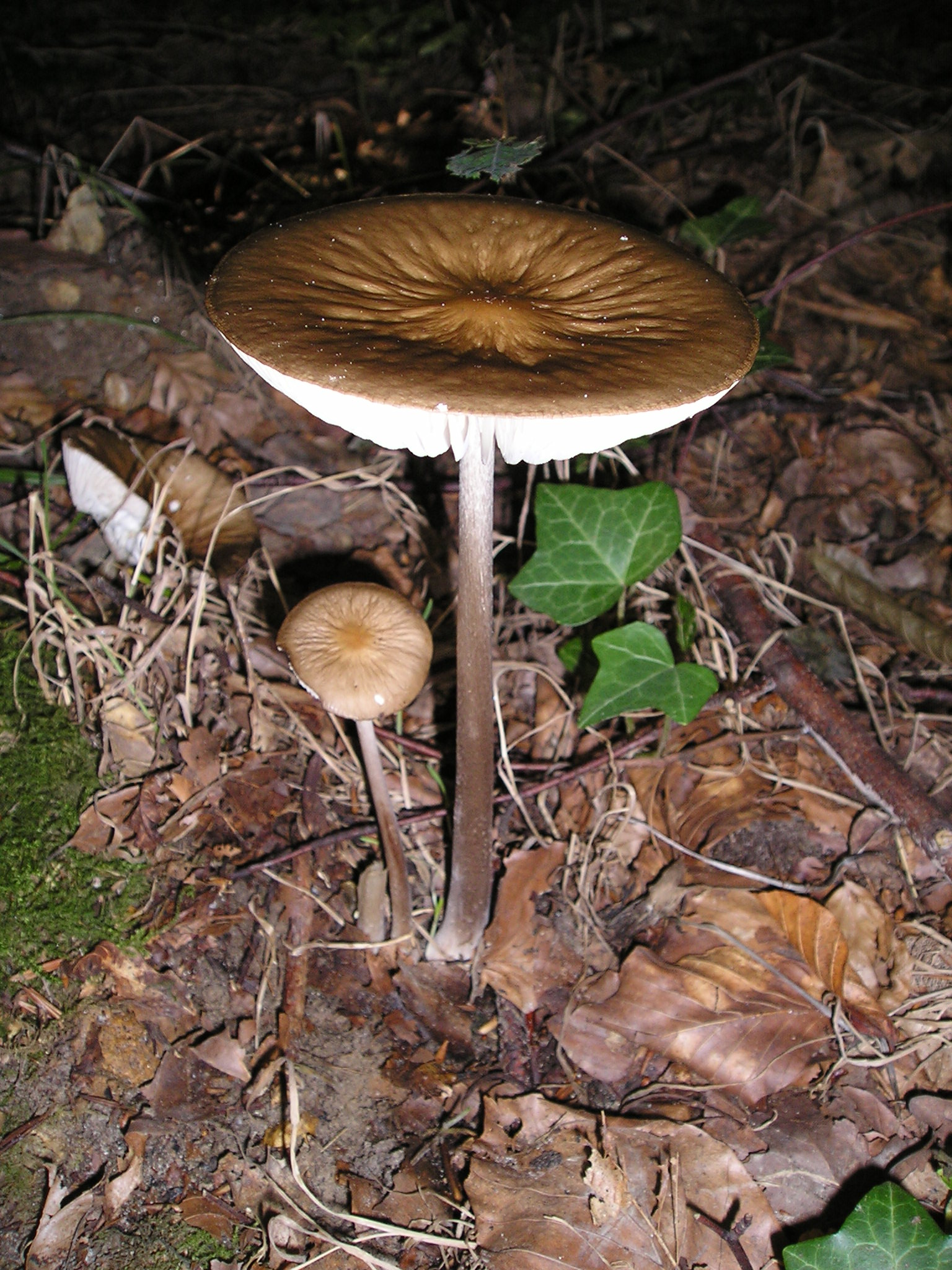
- Hymenopellis radicata

Scientific classification
- Kingdom: Fungi
- Division: Basidiomycota
- Class: Agaricomycetes
- Order: Agaricales
- Family: Physalacriaceae
- Genus: Hymenopellis; R.H.Petersen (2010)

Type species
- Hymenopellis radicata (Relhan) R.H.Petersen (2010)

= Hymenopellis =

Genus of fungi

Hymenopellis is a genus of fungi in the family Physalacriaceae. The genus was circumscribed by mycologist Ron Petersen in 2010. The type species is Hymenopellis radicata, originally described by British botanist Richard Relhan in 1780 as Agaricus radicatus.

== Species ==
- Hymenopellis africana
- Hymenopellis ahmadii
- Hymenopellis altissima
- Hymenopellis alveolata
- Hymenopellis amygdaliformis
- Hymenopellis atrocaerulea
- Hymenopellis aureocystidiata
- Hymenopellis bispora
- Hymenopellis caulovillosa
- Hymenopellis chiangmaiae
- Hymenopellis colensoi
- Hymenopellis crassibasidiata
- Hymenopellis endochorda
- Hymenopellis eradicata
- Hymenopellis furfuracea
- Hymenopellis gigaspora
- Hymenopellis hispanica
- Hymenopellis hygrophoroides
- Hymenopellis incognita
- Hymenopellis japonica
- Hymenopellis kenyae
- Hymenopellis keralae
- Hymenopellis limonispora
- Hymenopellis mammicystis
- Hymenopellis megalospora
- Hymenopellis mundroola
- Hymenopellis neuroderma
- Hymenopellis orientalis
- Hymenopellis radicata
- Hymenopellis raphanipes
- Hymenopellis rubrobrunnescens
- Hymenopellis rugosoceps
- Hymenopellis semiglabripes
- Hymenopellis sinapicolor
- Hymenopellis superbiens
- Hymenopellis tetrasperma
- Hymenopellis trichofera
- Hymenopellis variabilis
- Hymenopellis velata
- Hymenopellis vinocontusa
- Hymenopellis xeruloides
