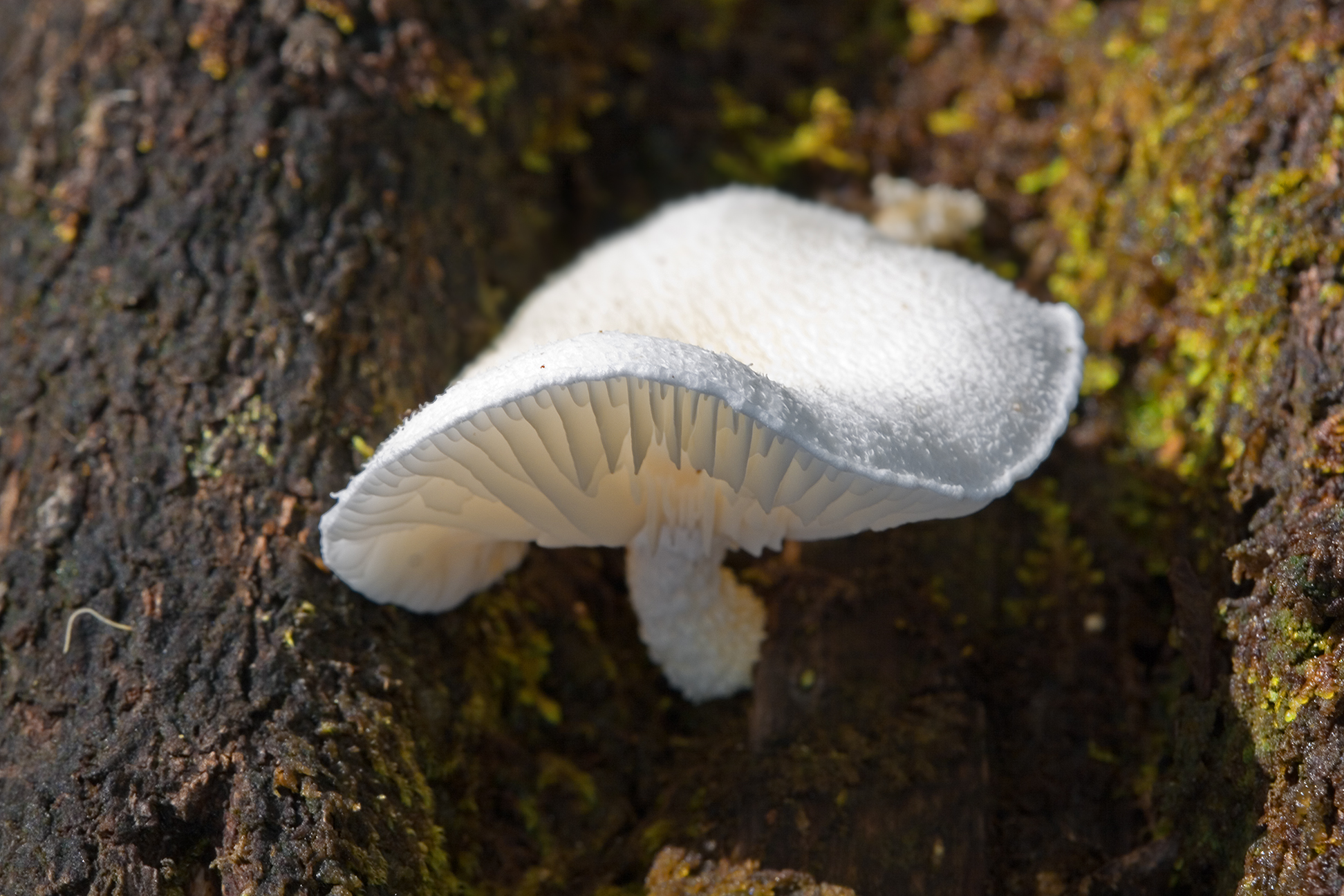
- Oudemansiella australis

Scientific classification
- Kingdom: Fungi
- Division: Basidiomycota
- Class: Agaricomycetes
- Order: Agaricales
- Family: Physalacriaceae; Corner (1970)

Type genus
- Physalacria Peck (1882)

= Physalacriaceae =

Family of fungi

The Physalacriaceae are a family of fungi in the order Agaricales. Species in the family have a widespread distribution, ranging from the Arctic, (Rhizomarasmius), to the tropics, e.g. Gloiocephala, and from marine sites (Mycaureola) and fresh waters (Gloiocephala) to semiarid forests (Xerula).

== Description ==
Most species in the Physalacriaceae form fruit bodies with caps and stipes. They have a monomitic hyphal system (wherein only generative hypha are produced), and clamp connections are present in the hyphae. Basidia (spore-bearing cells) are club-shaped with two to four sterigmata. The basidiospores generally have ellipsoidal, spindle-like (fusiform), cylindrical, or tear-drop (lacrimiform) shapes; they are thin-walled, hyaline, and do not react with Melzer's reagent. The family also contains corticioid fungi (in genus Cylindrobasidium) and a secotioid species (Guyanagaster necrorhiza).

== Taxonomy ==
The family was originally defined by English mycologist E.J.H. Corner in 1970 and revised in 1985 by Jacques Berthier but neither author anticipated the application to a molecularly defined group of agarics first identified by Moncalvo and others in 2002. Molecular studies placed Physalacria, formerly the sole genus in this family, together with the agaric genera Flammulina, Xerula and Armillaria. Due to the precedence rules based on date of publication, the family name "Physalacriaceae" became applicable for all these fungi, making the former family "Xerulaceae" obsolete.

== Genera ==
- Armillaria
- Cylindrobasidium
- Cibaomyces
- Cribbea
- Cryptomarasmius
- Cyptotrama
- Dactylosporina
- Desarmillaria
- Flammulina
- Gloiocephala
- Guyanagaster
- Himantia
- Hormomitaria
- Hymenopellis
- Laccariopsis
- Mycaureola
- Mycotribulus
- Naiadolina
- Oudemansiella
- Paraxerula
- Physalacria
- Ponticulomyces
- Protoxerula
- Pseudohiatula
- Rhizomarasmius
- Rhodotus
- Strobilurus
- Xerula

== See also ==
- List of Agaricales families
