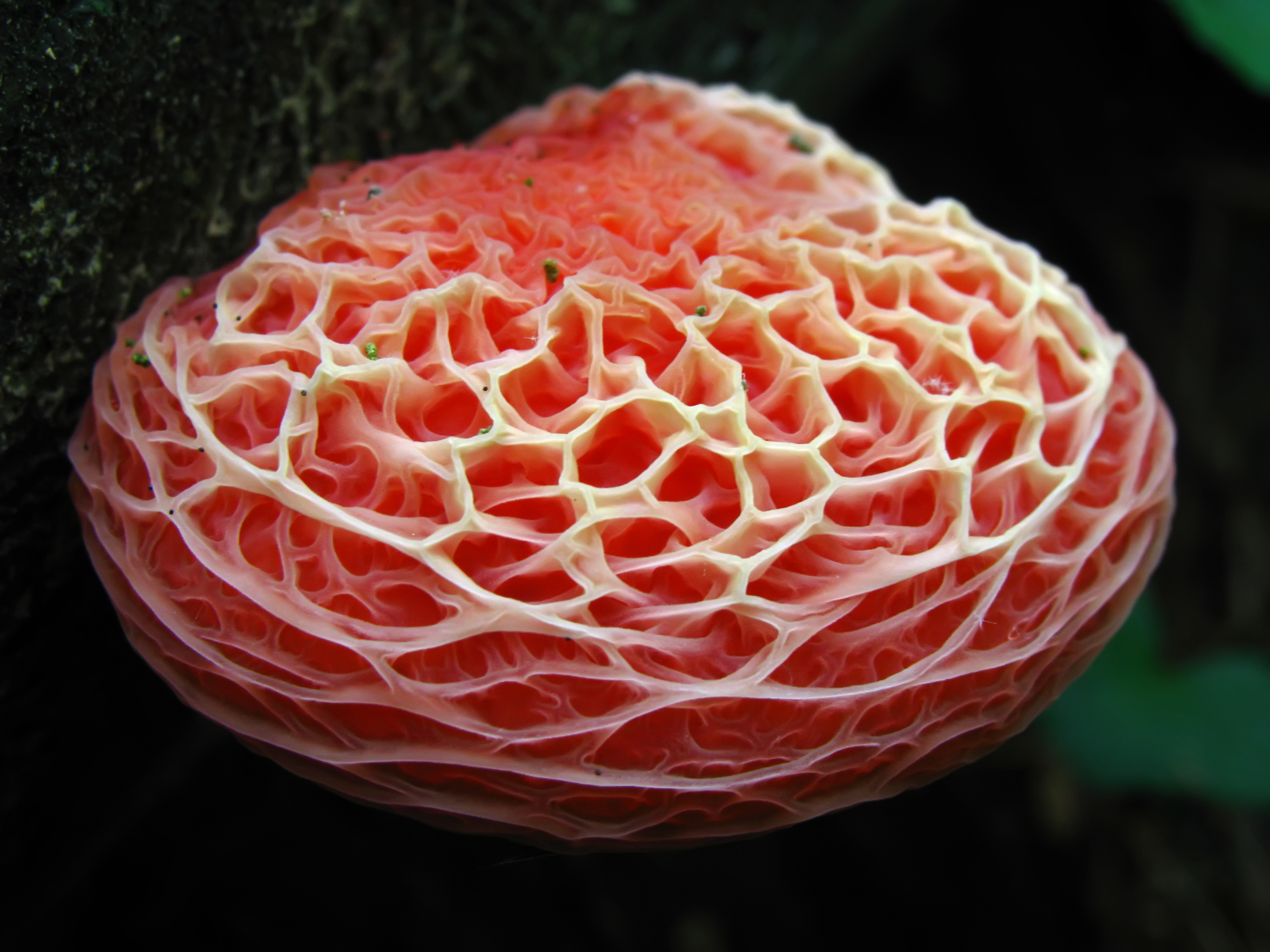
- Rhodotus palmatus, top view of cap surface

Scientific classification
- Kingdom: Fungi
- Division: Basidiomycota
- Class: Agaricomycetes
- Order: Agaricales
- Family: Physalacriaceae
- Genus: Rhodotus; Maire (1926)

Type species
- Rhodotus palmatus (Bull.) Maire (1926)

Synonyms
- Agaricus palmatus (1785)

= Rhodotus =

Genus of fungus

Rhodotus palmatus
- Mycological characteristics
- Gills on hymenium
- Cap is convex
- Hymenium is adnate
- Stipe is bare
- Spore print is white to pink
- Ecology is saprotrophic
- Edibility is unknown

Rhodotus is a genus in the fungus family Physalacriaceae. There are two species in the genus with the best known, Rhodotus palmatus, called the netted rhodotus, the rosy veincap, or the wrinkled peach. The unique characteristics of R. palmatus have made it difficult for taxonomists to agree on how it should be classified, resulting in an elaborate taxonomical history and an extensive synonymy. First named Agaricus palmatus by Bulliard in 1785, it was reclassified into several different genera before becoming Rhodotus in 1926. The familial placement of the genus Rhodotus within the order Agaricales has also been subject to dispute, and the taxon has been transferred variously to the families Amanitaceae, Entolomataceae, and Tricholomataceae. More recently, molecular phylogenetics analysis has helped determine that Rhodotus is most closely related to genera in the Physalacriaceae.

Mature specimens can usually be identified by the pinkish color and the distinctive ridged and veined surface of their rubbery caps. Variations in the color and quantity of light received during development lead to variations in the size, shape, and cap color of fruit bodies. Typically found growing on the stumps and logs of rotting hardwoods, this uncommon species has a circumboreal distribution, and has been collected in Eurasia, northern Africa, and eastern North America. Declining populations in Europe have led to its appearance in over half of the European fungal Red Lists of threatened species.

== Taxonomy ==
The type species of genus Rhodotus was originally described as Agaricus palmatus in 1785 by French botanist Jean Bulliard; mycologist Elias Magnus Fries later included it under the same name in his Systema Mycologicum. It was transferred to the then newly described genus Rhodotus in a 1926 publication by French mycologist René Maire. French botanist Claude Gillet called the species Pleurotus subpalmatus in 1876. A 1986 paper established Rhodotus palmatus as synonymous with Pleurotus pubescens (first described by American mycologist Charles Horton Peck in 1891). According to the same publication, another synonym is Lentinula reticeps, described by William Alphonso Murrill in 1915, who thought it to be synonymous with Agaricus reticeps (described by Montagne in 1856), A. reticulatus (Johnson, 1880), A. alveolatus (Cragin, 1885), Pluteus alveolatus (Saccardo, 1887), and Panus meruliiceps (Peck, 1905).

The placement of Rhodotus in the order Agaricales is uncertain, and various authors have offered solutions to the taxonomic conundrum. In 1951, Agaricales specialist Rolf Singer placed Rhodotus in the Amanitaceae because of similarities between the tribes Amaniteae and Rhodoteae, such as spore color and ornamentation (modifications of the spore wall that result in surface irregularities), structure of the hyphae and trama, and chlamydospore production during culture growth.

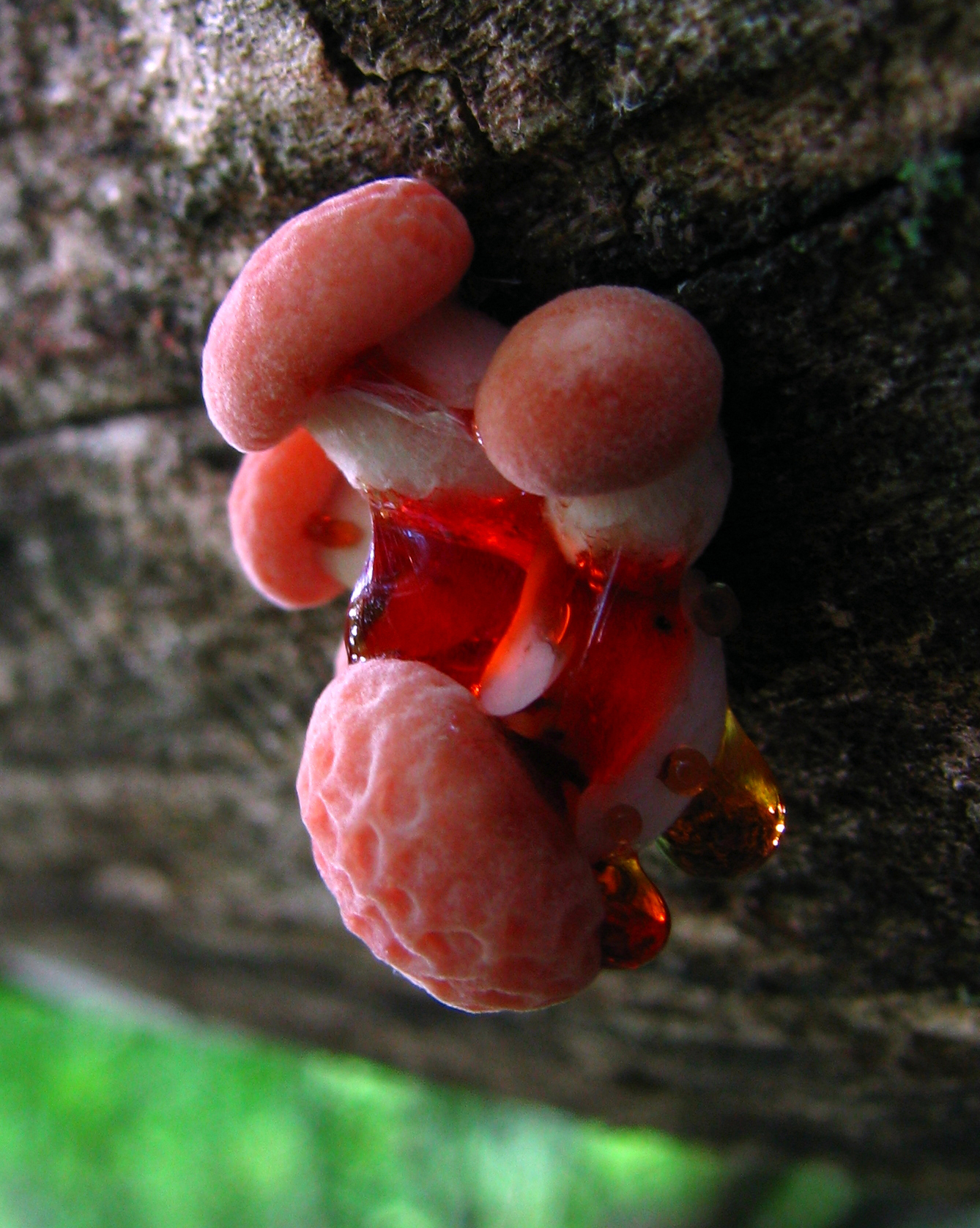
Young specimens showing guttation

In 1953, French mycologists Robert Kühner and Henri Romagnesi placed Rhodotus in the family Tricholomataceae—a traditional "wastebasket taxon"—on the basis of spore color. In 1969, Besson argued for the placement of Rhodotus with the Entolomataceae after studying the ultrastructure of the spores. By 1986, Singer had revised the placement of Rhodotus in his latest edition of The Agaricales in Modern Taxonomy, noting that "It has formerly been inserted in the family Amanitaceae but is obviously closer to tribus Pseudohiatuleae of the Tricholomataceae." Tribe Pseudohiatuleae included such genera as Flammulina, Pseudohiatula, Cyptotrama, and Callistodermatium. In 1988, a proposal was made to split the Tricholomataceae into several new families, including a family, Rhodotaceae, to contain the problematic genus.

The use of molecular phylogenetics has helped to clarify the proper taxonomic placement of Rhodotus. Studies of the ribosomal DNA sequences from a wide variety of agaric fungi have corroborated Kühner and Romagnesi's placement of Rhodotus in the Tricholomataceae as then understood. A large scale phylogenetic analysis published in 2005 showed Rhodotus to be in the "core euagarics clade", a name given to a grouping of gilled mushrooms corresponding largely to the suborder Agaricineae as defined by Singer (1986), but also including taxa that were traditionally classified in the Aphyllophorales (e.g., Clavaria, Typhula, Fistulina, Schizophyllum, etc.) and several orders of Gasteromycetes (e.g., Hymenogastrales, Lycoperdales, Nidulariales). These results corroborated a previous study which showed Rhodotus to be part of a clade containing species such as Cyptotrama asprata, Marasmius trullisatus, Flammulina velutipes, Xerula furfuracea, Gloiocephala menieri, and Armillaria tabescens. The genera containing these latter species have been reassigned to the family Physalacriaceae; as of 2009, both Index Fungorum and MycoBank also list Rhodotus as belonging to the Physalacriaceae. Follow up molecular genetics surveys of Physalacriaceae fungi in China identified Rhodotus asperior as the second member of the Rhodotus genus.

=== Etymology ===
The specific epithet is derived from the Latin palmatus, meaning "shaped like a hand"—possibly a reference to the resemblance of the cap surface to the lines in the palm of a hand. Common names for R. palmatus include the netted rhodotus, the rosy veincap, and the wrinkled peach.

== Description ==
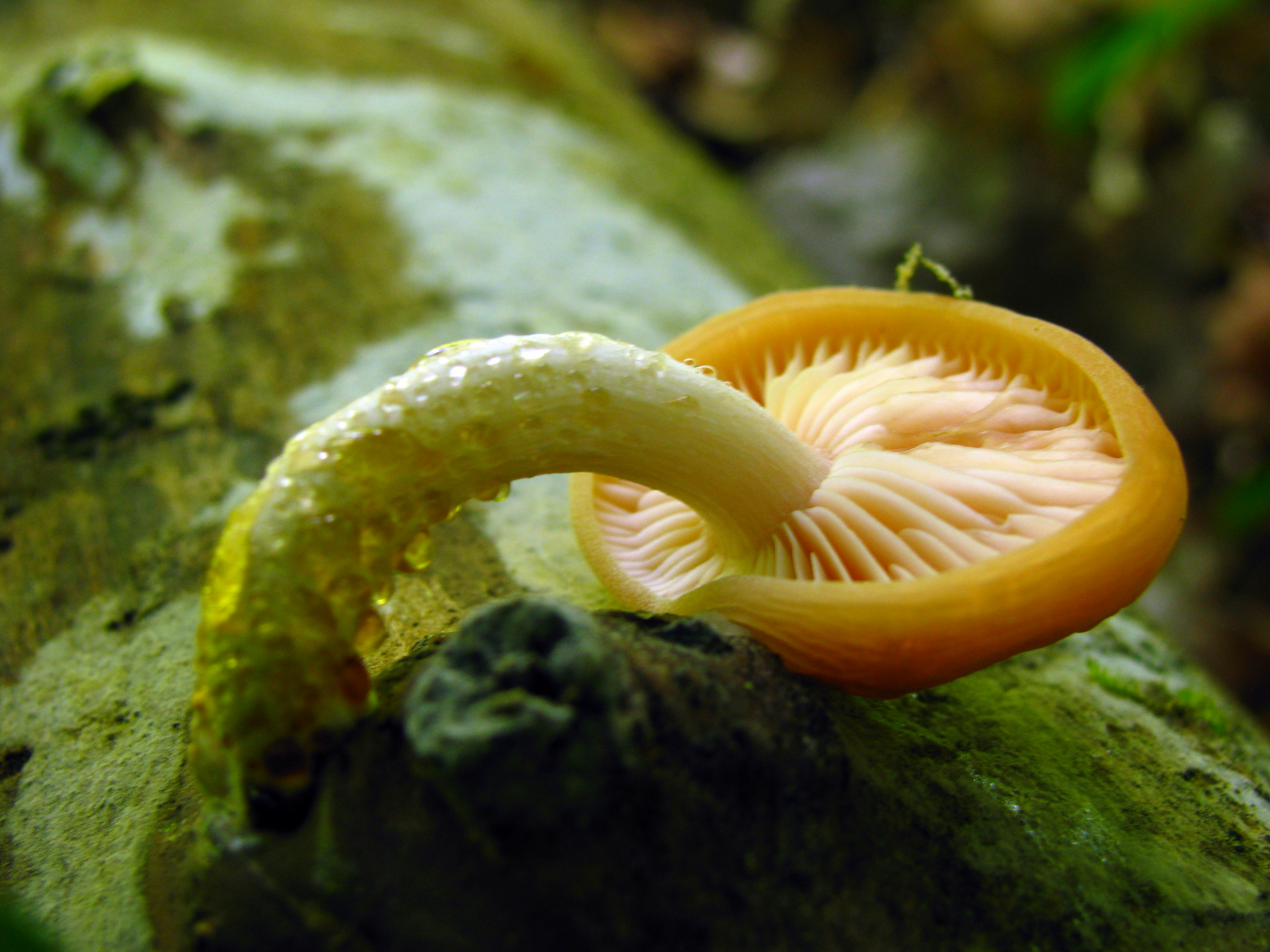
Rolled-in cap margins and adnate gill attachment to the stem are typical characteristics.

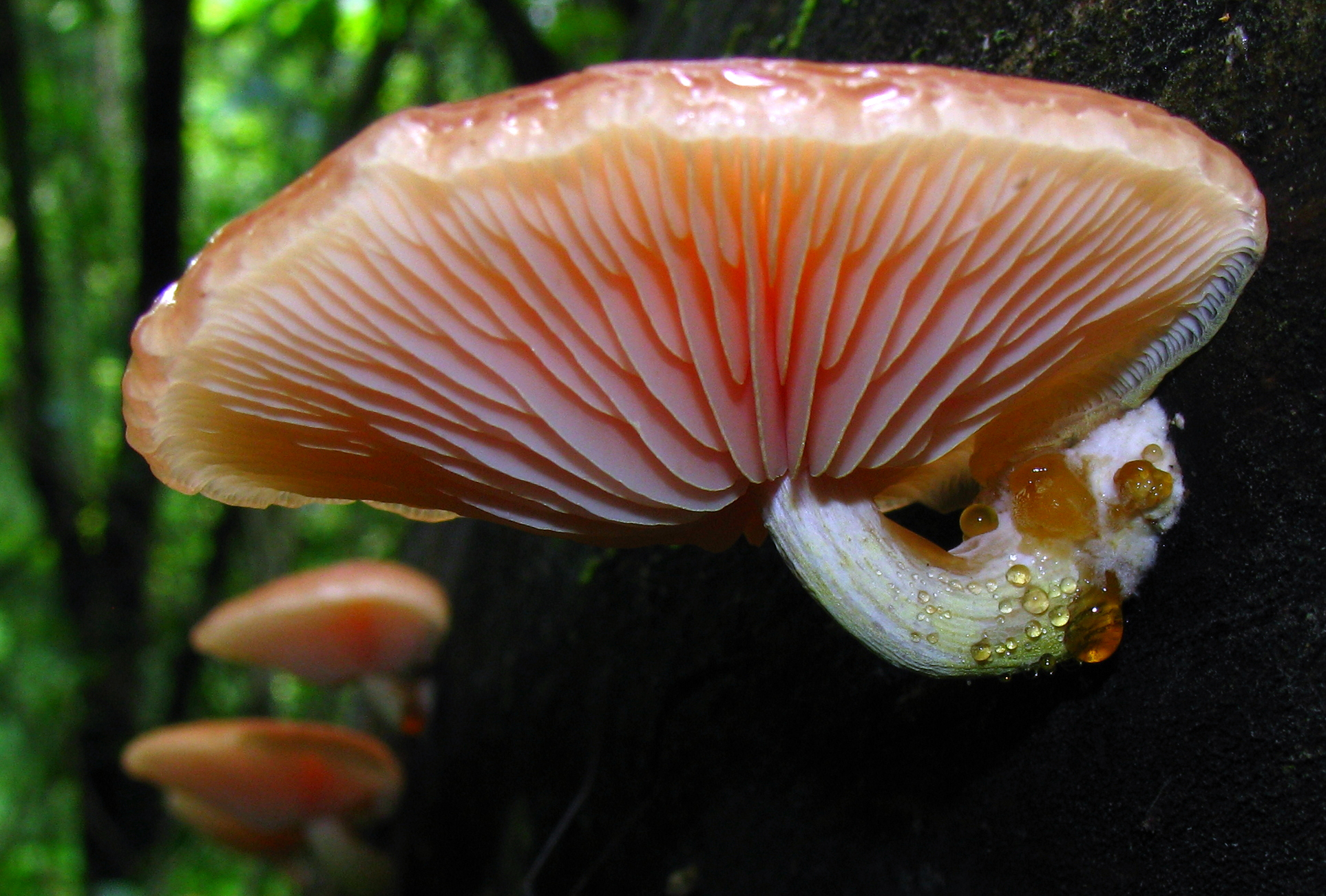
Some short gills, called lamellulae, do not extend entirely from the cap edge to the stem.

The fruit body of Rhodotus has a cap, and stem without a ring or volva. The cap initially assumes a convex shape before flattening somewhat with age, and typically reaches widths of 2–6 centimeters (0.8–2.4 in). The edges of the cap are rolled inwards, and the cap surface typically has a conspicuous network of lightly colored ridges or veins that outline deep and narrow grooves or pits—a condition technically termed sulcate or reticulate. Between the ridges, the surface color is somewhat variable; depending on the lighting conditions experienced by the mushroom during its development, it may range from salmon-orange to pink to red. The texture of the cap surface is gelatinous, and the internal flesh is firm but rubbery, and pinkish in color.

The gills have an adnate attachment to the stem, that is, broadly attached to the stem along all or most of the gill width. The gills are thick, packed close to each other, with veins and color similar to, but paler than, the cap. Some of the gills do not extend the full distance from the edge of the cap to the stem. These short gills, called lamellulae, form two to four groups of roughly equal length. The stem is 1.5–3.0 cm (0.6–1.2 in) tall and 0.4–0.6 cm (0.16–0.24 in) thick (usually slightly larger near the base), and may be attached to the underside of the cap in a central or lateral manner. Like the cap color, stem size is also affected by the type of light received during fruit body maturation.

In nature, Rhodotus palmatus is sometimes seen "bleeding" a red- or orange-colored liquid. A similar phenomenon has also been observed when it is grown in laboratory culture on a petri dish: the orange-colored drops that appear on the mat formed by fungal mycelia precede the initial appearance of fruit bodies. The mature fruit body will turn green when exposed to a 10% aqueous solution of iron(II) sulfate (FeSO_{4}), a common mushroom identification test known as iron salts.

=== Microscopic features ===
In deposit, the spore color of Rhodotus palmatus has been described most commonly as pink, but also as cream colored. Viewed microscopically, the spores of Rhodotus have a roughly spherical shape, with dimensions of 6–7.2 by 5.6–6.5 μm; the spore surface is marked with numerous wart-like projections (defined as verrucose), typically 0.5–0.7 μm long. The spores are non-amyloid—unable to take up iodine stain in the chemical test with Melzer's reagent.

The spore-bearing cells, the basidia, are club-shaped and 4-spored, with dimensions of 33.6–43.2 by 5.6–8 μm. Although this species lacks cells called pleurocystidia (large sterile cells found on the gill face in some mushrooms), it contains abundant cheilocystidia (large sterile cells found on the gill edge) that are 27.2–48 by 4.8–8 μm in size. Clamp connections are present in the hyphae. The outer cellular layer of the cap cuticle is made of bladder-shaped, thick-walled hyphae, each individually supported by a small stalk that extends down into a "gelatinized zone".

Chlamydospores are asexual reproductive units made by some fungi that allow them to exist solely as mycelium, a process which helps them survive over periods unsuitable for growth; Rhodotus was shown experimentally to be capable of producing these structures in 1906. The chlamydospores of Rhodotus are thick-walled cells that develop from single hyphal compartments, and have dimensions of 12–8 μm (0.00047–0.00031 in) by 8–6 μm (0.00031–0.00024 in).

== Habitat and distribution ==
Rhodotus palmatus is saprobic, meaning it obtains nutrients from decomposing organic matter. It grows scattered or clustered in small groups on rotting hardwoods, such as basswood, maple, and especially elm; in Europe it is known to grow on horse chestnut. The mushroom prefers low-lying logs in areas that are periodically flooded and that receive little sunlight, such as areas shaded by forest canopy. A pioneer species in the fungal colonization of dead wood, it prefers to grow on relatively undecayed substrates. It is often found growing on dark-stained wood, especially the dried-out upper parts of trunks that have lost their bark. R. palmatus tends to fruit in cooler and moister weather, from spring to autumn in the United States, or autumn to winter in Britain and Europe.

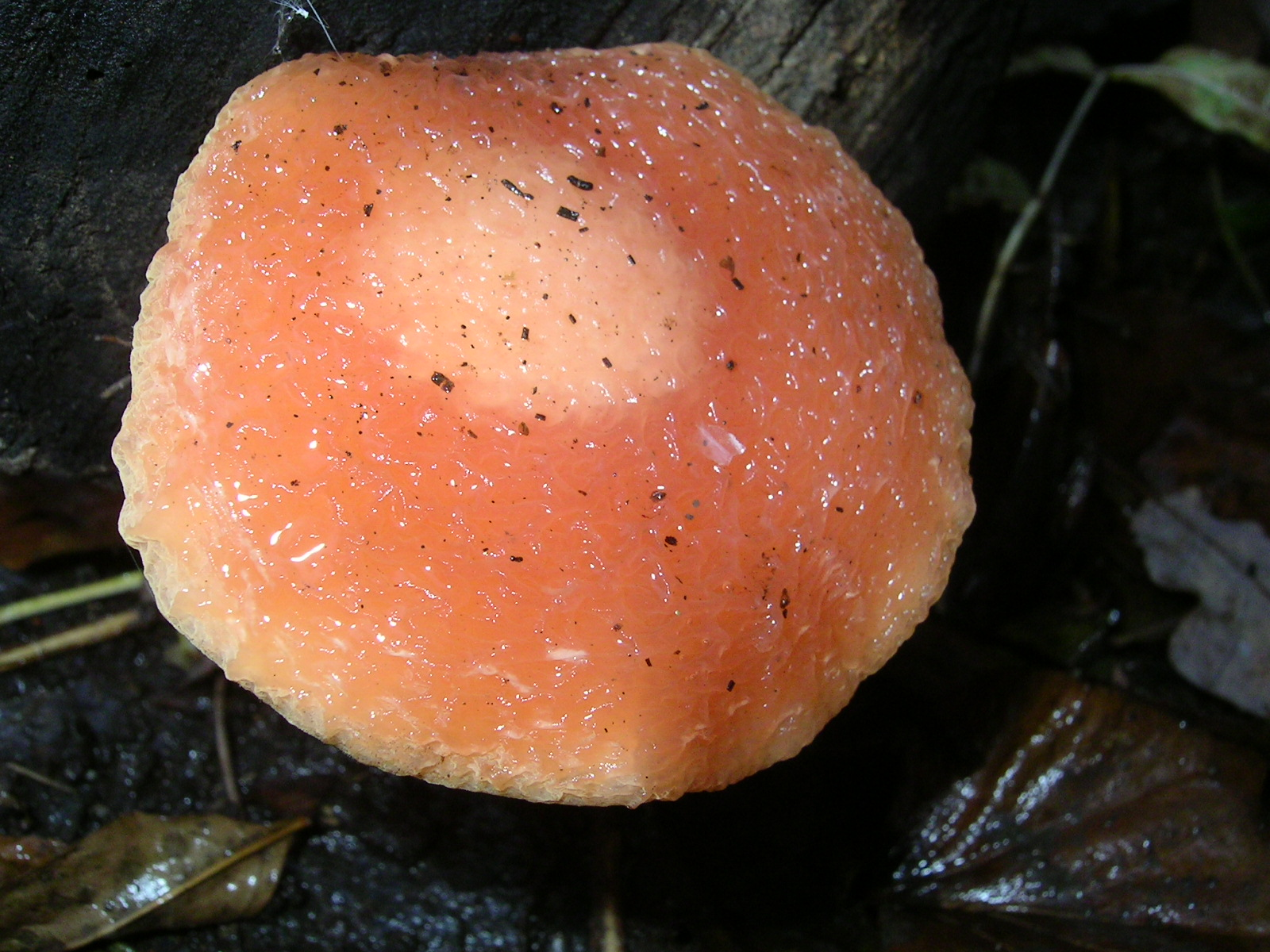
Specimen with more pronounced gelatinous surface and less distinct reticulations

Described as having a circumboreal distribution, R. palmatus has been reported from Iran, Hungary, Italy, Poland, Slovakia, Denmark, Sweden, Norway, Germany, the area formerly known as the USSR, Korea, Japan, New Zealand, Canada, and the eastern U.S., from Kansas to Virginia northward. Although often described as "rare", a 1997 study suggests that it may be relatively common in Illinois. It has been suggested that an increase in the number of dead elms, a byproduct of Dutch elm disease, has contributed to its resurgence.

=== Light requirements ===
Light at the red end of the visible spectrum has been observed to be required for the development of R. palmatus fruit bodies, contrary to the typical requirement for blue light seen with many other mushroom species. Fruiting occurs in the presence of green, yellow or red light with wavelengths above 500 nm, but only when blue light (under 500 nm) is absent. Consequently, phenotypic variations observed in the field—such as size, shape, and cap color—may be influenced by differing conditions of light color and intensity. For example, specimens grown in the laboratory under green light had fruit bodies with short, straight stems and pale orange, large caps with well-developed ridges and pits, an appearance similar to specimens found in the field that were growing under a canopy of green leaves. Laboratory-grown specimens under amber light had bright orange, small caps with less pronounced reticulations; similarly, field specimens found in the fall, after the leaves had fallen, were more orange to orange-pink in color.

== Conservation ==
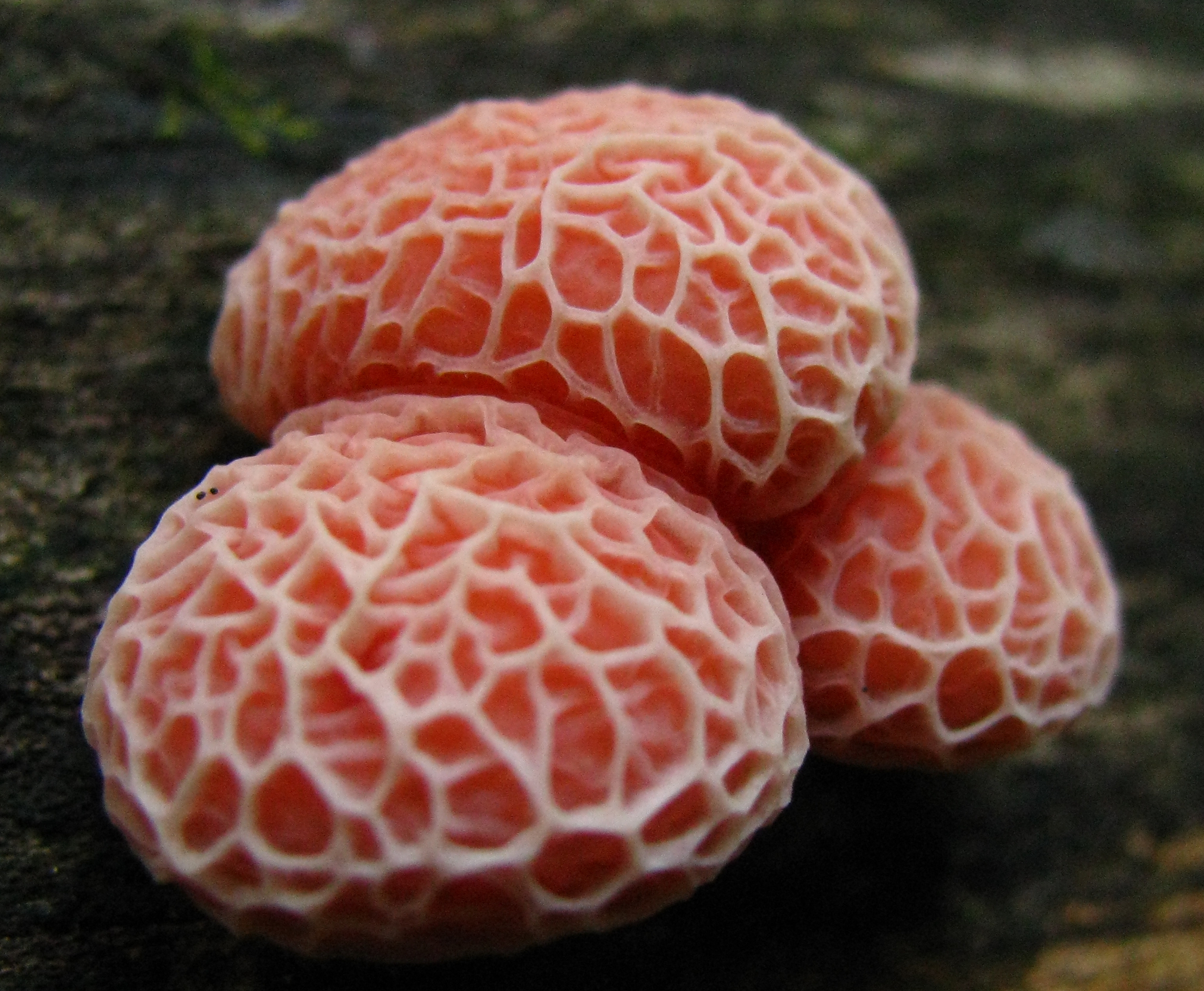
Fruit bodies can grow singly, or in clusters.

In the 1980s in Europe, increases in the levels of air pollution, as well as changing land use practices coincided with reports of declines in the populations of certain mushrooms. Consequently, a number of fungal conservation initiatives were started to better understand fungal biodiversity; as of October 2007, 31 European countries have produced fungal Red Lists of threatened species. Rhodotus palmatus is a candidate species in over half of the European fungal Red Lists, and is listed as critically endangered, endangered, or near threatened (or the equivalent) in 12 countries. In the Baltic countries Estonia, Latvia, and Lithuania, it is considered by the Environmental Protection Ministries (a branch of government charged with implementing the Convention on Biological Diversity) to be regionally extinct, reported as "extinct or probably extinct". It was one of 35 fungal species to gain legal protection in Hungary in 2005, making it a fineable offense to pick them.

== Uses ==
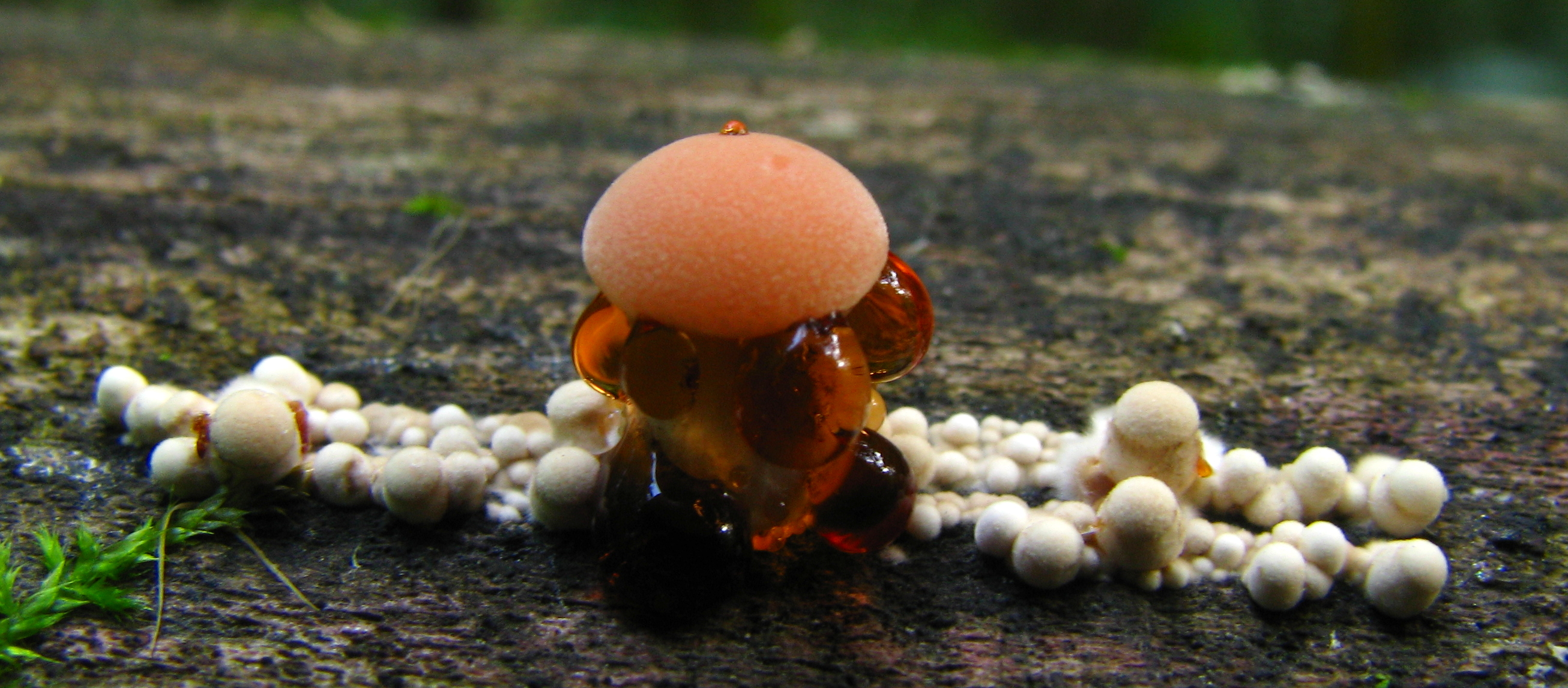
Minute fruit bodies showing "pin" and "button" stages of development

Depending on the source consulted, the edibility of Rhodotus palmatus is typically listed as unknown or inedible. The species has no distinguishable odor, and a "bitter" taste, although one early description referred to the taste as "sweet".

As part of a Spanish research study to evaluate the antimicrobial activity of mushrooms, R. palmatus was one of 204 species screened against a panel of human clinical pathogens and laboratory control strains. Using a standard laboratory method to determine antimicrobial susceptibility, the mushroom was shown to have moderate antibacterial activity against Bacillus subtilis, and weak antifungal activity against both Saccharomyces cerevisiae and Aspergillus fumigatus.

== Notes ==
=== Cited text ===
- Singer R. (1986). The Agaricales in Modern Taxonomy. 4th rev. ed. Koenigstein: Koeltz Scientific Books. ISBN 3-87429-254-1.
