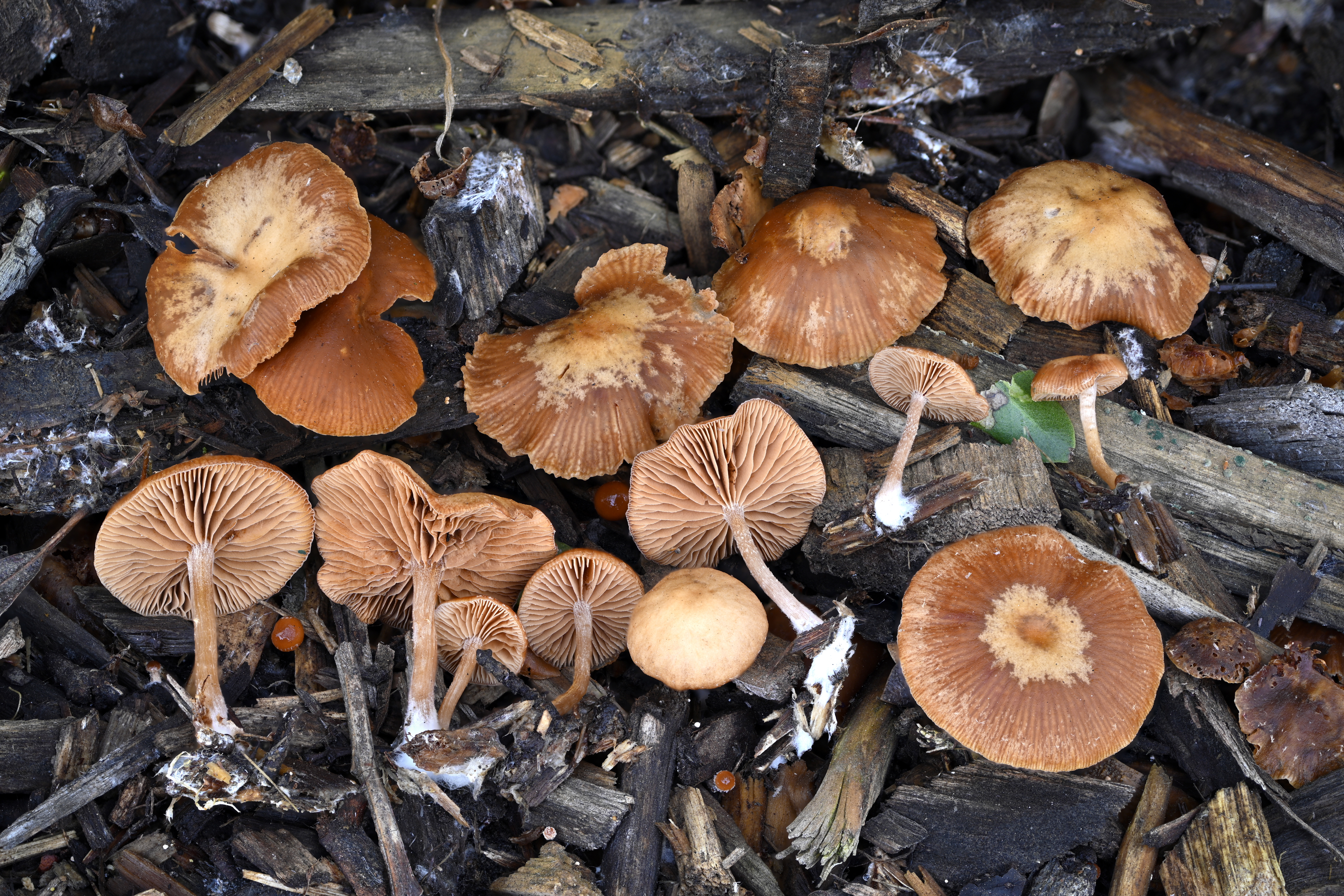

Scientific classification
- Kingdom: Fungi
- Division: Basidiomycota
- Class: Agaricomycetes
- Order: Agaricales
- Family: Tubariaceae
- Genus: Tubaria
- Species: T. furfuracea

Binomial name
- Tubaria furfuracea (Pers.) Gillet (1876)

Synonyms
- Agaricus furfuraceus Pers. (1801)

= Tubaria furfuracea =

Species of fungus

Tubaria furfuracea
- Mycological characteristics
- Gills on hymenium
- Cap is convex or flat
- Hymenium is adnate or decurrent
- Stipe is bare or has a ring
- Spore print is brown
- Ecology is saprotrophic
- Edibility is unknown

Tubaria furfuracea in Bamberg, Germany

Tubaria furfuracea, commonly known as the scurfy twiglet, totally tedious tubaria, or fringed tubaria, is a common species of agaric fungus in the family Tubariaceae.

== Taxonomy ==
It was first described by Christiaan Hendrik Persoon in 1801, as a species of Agaricus. French mycologist Claude-Casimir Gillet transferred it to the genus, Tubaria in 1876.

== Description ==
The mushroom cap is 1–4 cm wide, orange-brown, convex to flat and depressed, with small marginal patches of veil which disappear with age or rain; its odor is mild. The gills are brown and adnate to slightly decurrent. The stalk is 1–6 cm tall and 2–4 mm wide. The spores are pale reddish-brown, elliptical, and smooth. The spore print is brown.

This species is considered inedible.

=== Similar species ===
Similar species include T. confragosa, T. conspersa, and members of Laccaria.

Additionally, Galerina marginata and Psilocybe cyanescens may appear similar.
