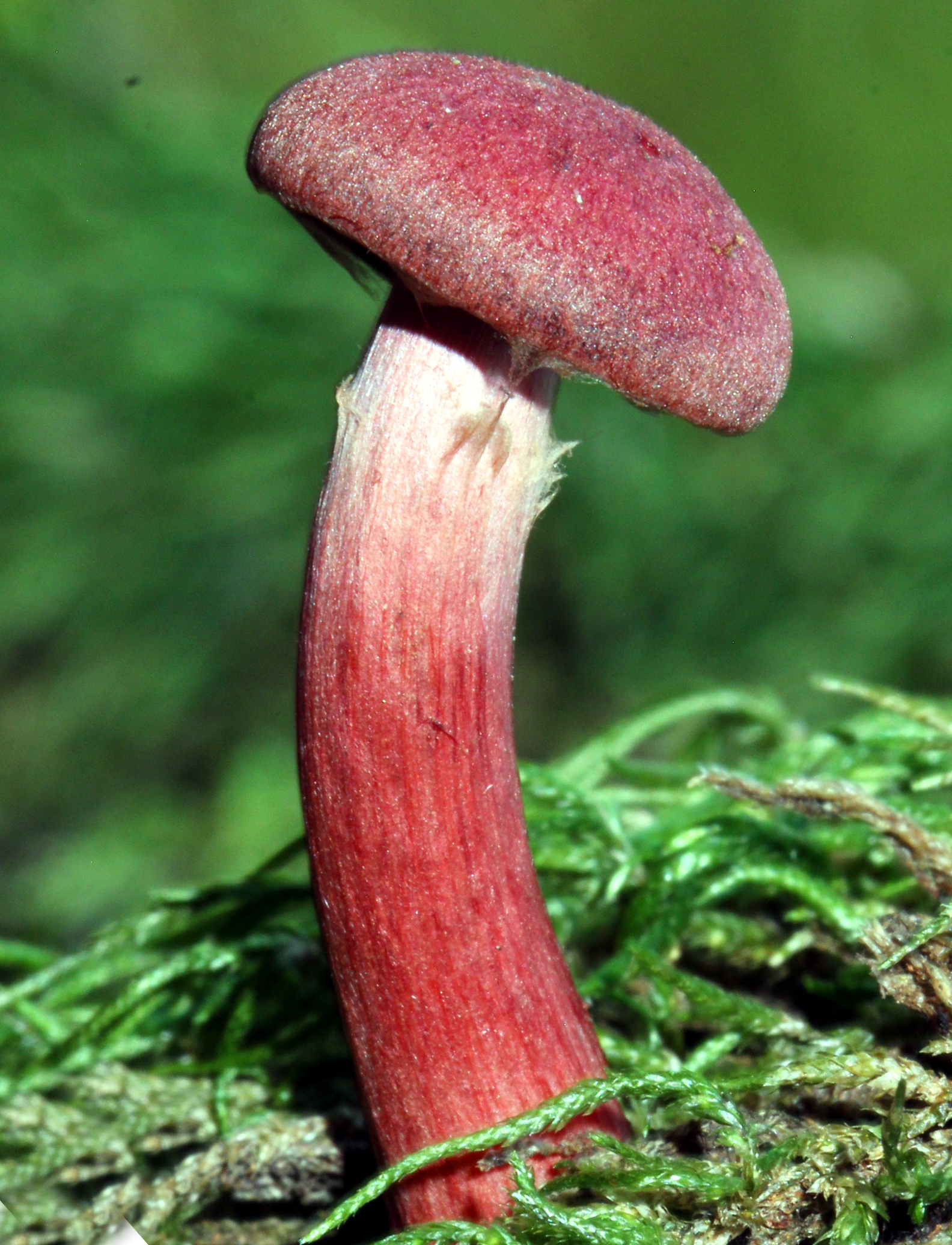
- In Henry Cowell Redwoods State Park, California, USA

Scientific classification
- Domain: Eukaryota
- Kingdom: Fungi
- Division: Basidiomycota
- Class: Agaricomycetes
- Order: Agaricales
- Family: Tubariaceae
- Genus: Tubaria
- Species: T. punicea

Binomial name
- Tubaria punicea (A.H.Sm. & Hesler) Ammirati, Matheny & P.-A.Moreau (2007)

Synonyms
- Pholiota punicea A.H.Sm. & Hesler (1968)

= Tubaria punicea =

Species of fungus

Tubaria punicea is a rare species of agaric fungus in the family Tubariaceae. It is found on the west coast of North America, where it grows on the bases and in hollows of madrone (genus Arbutus).

== Taxonomy ==
The fungus was first described in 1968 by American mycologists Alexander H. Smith and Lexemuel Ray Hesler as Pholiota punicea. The type specimen was collected by Smith in November 1937 from a burned stump at the California–Oregon state line. The species was transferred to Tubaria in 2007, in the section Confragosae, which contains species that either produce wine-red (vinaceous) fruit bodies or have a ring on the stipe. Other species in the section include T. rufofulva, T. vinicolor, T. confragosa, T. bispora, and T. serrulata. The Latin specific epithet punicea means "reddish-purple".

== Description ==
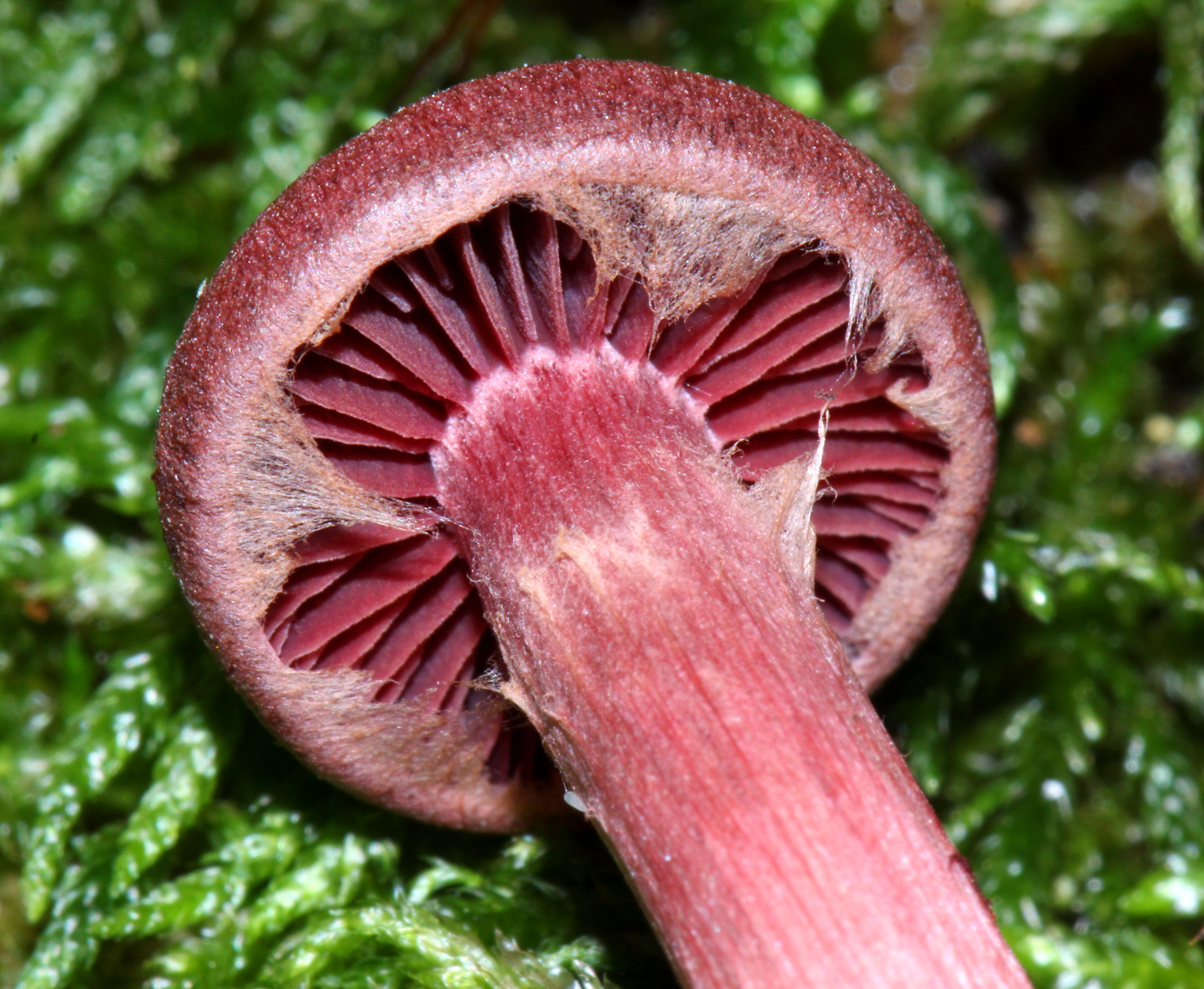
Young gills are deep vinaceous.

Fruit bodies have caps that are initially hemispherical to convex, but later become flattened, sometimes developing a low, broad umbo; the cap diameter is 1–5 cm (0.4–2.0 in). Its surface is dry, and its color vinaceous, with lighter margins. The cap margin is curved downward, and has faint radial grooves. It may be irregular in instances where fruit bodies have grown together in clusters. The gills have an adnate to somewhat decurrent attachment to the stipe. They are somewhat closely spaced. Initially deep vinaceous, they become brownish with a reddish tinge after the spores mature. The stipe measures 2–9 cm (0.8–3.5 in) long by 2.6–6 mm (0.1–0.2 in) thick, and the same width throughout its length, or slightly thicker at the base. It has a fibrillose surface texture, and, in mature specimens, faint longitudinal grooves. It is wine-red with a whitish base. Young individuals have a silky white partial veil that later becomes fibrillose (as if made of threadlike fibers) and vinaceous in color. The flesh is reddish brown and lacks any discernible odor. The spore print is cinnamon brown. Due to its rarity, the edibility of the mushroom has not been definitively established, but one report suggests that it is "harmless", with a flavor of "bland beef".

Spores are typically 7.2–7.8 by 4.6–5.1 μm with a shape ranging from somewhat phaseoliform (bean-shaped) to elliptical to egg-shaped. The basidia (spore-bearing cells) are narrowly club-shaped to somewhat cylindrical, one-, two- or four-spored, and measure 26–30 by 5–9 μm. There are some cystidia scattered in the hymenium, and they measure 20–33 by 3–5 μm. On the gill edge, the cheilocystidia are arranged in clusters; they are club-shaped to egg-shaped, and measure 30–65 by 4–12 μm. The cap cuticle is made of hyphae arranged in a cutis (with hyphae that run parallel to the cap surface) measuring 4–10 μm in diameter. Clamp connections are present in the hyphae.

=== Similar species ===
Based on overall appearance, the western North American species Tubaria vinicolor is virtually indistinguishable from T. punicea. The former fungus, however, occurs on woody debris in landscaped areas such as parks and gardens, which sets it apart from the madrone-associated T. punicea.

== Habitat and distribution ==
Tubaria punicea is a saprobic species, and grows on the rotting wood of Arbutus. Fruit bodies are commonly encountered in the hollowed bases of large trees. Usual habitats include mixed forests containing Pseudotsuga, Arbutus, or Quercus. A rare species, the fungus is distributed on the west coast of North America from British Columbia, Canada, to Marin County, California.
