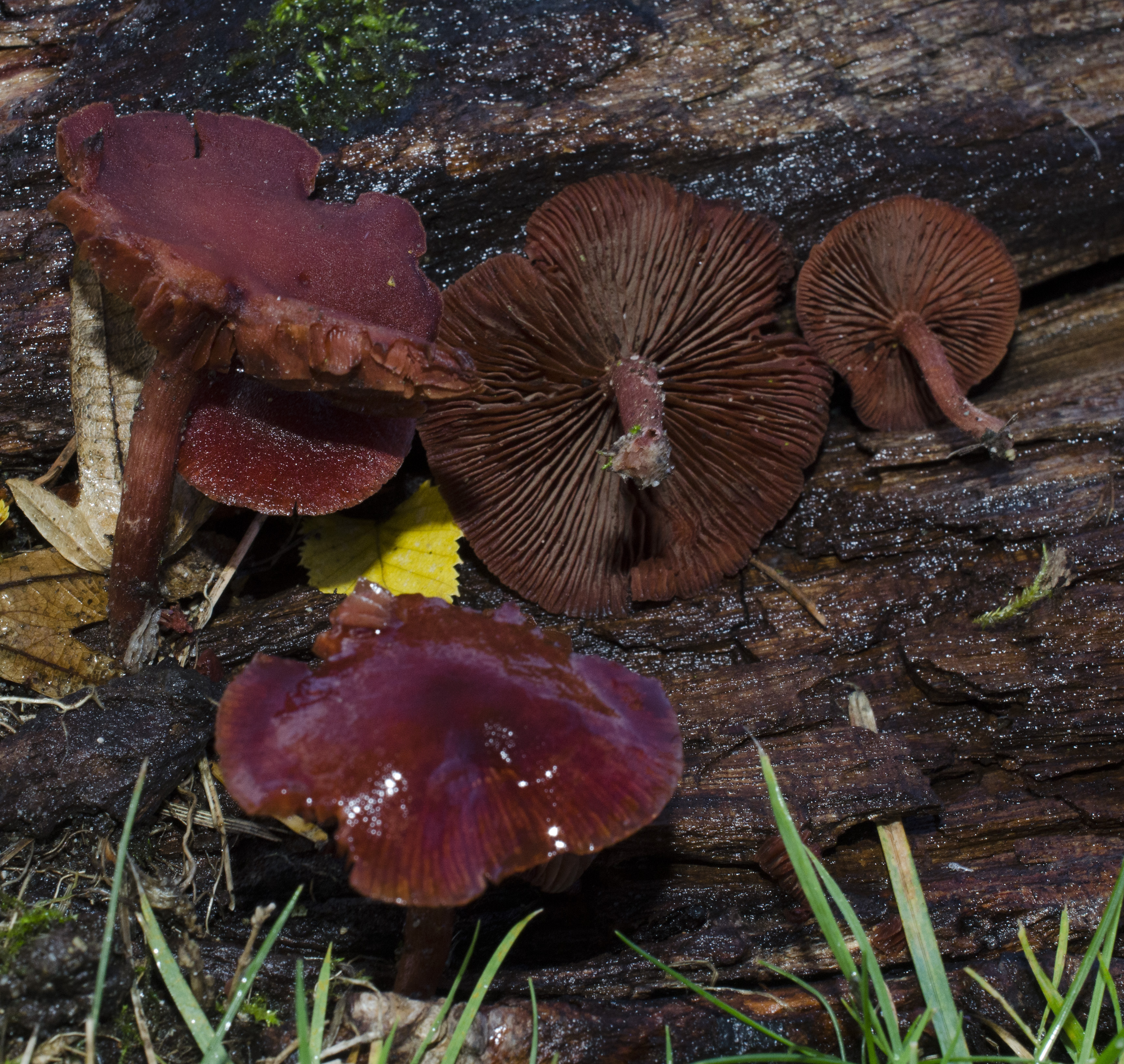

Scientific classification
- Kingdom: Fungi
- Division: Basidiomycota
- Class: Agaricomycetes
- Order: Agaricales
- Family: Tubariaceae
- Genus: Tubaria
- Species: T. vinicolor

Binomial name
- Tubaria vinicolor (Peck) Matheny & Vellinga

= Tubaria vinicolor =

Species of fungus

Tubaria vinicolor Mycological characteristics
- Gills on hymenium
- Cap is convex or flat
- Hymenium is adnate or decurrent
- Stipe is bare or has a ring
- Spore print is brown
- Edibility is unknown

Tubaria vinicolor, commonly known as the wine-colored twiglet, is a species of mushroom in the family Tubariaceae. It has a red cap, and is found in cities. It is rare, and found on the Pacific coast of North America. Tubaria vinicolor often grows on woodchips, and has a cortina. This cortina temporarily leaves a ring zone on the stipe. Tubaria vinicolor looks similar to T. punicea. However, T. punicea is typically found in forests, where it grows on madrone wood.
