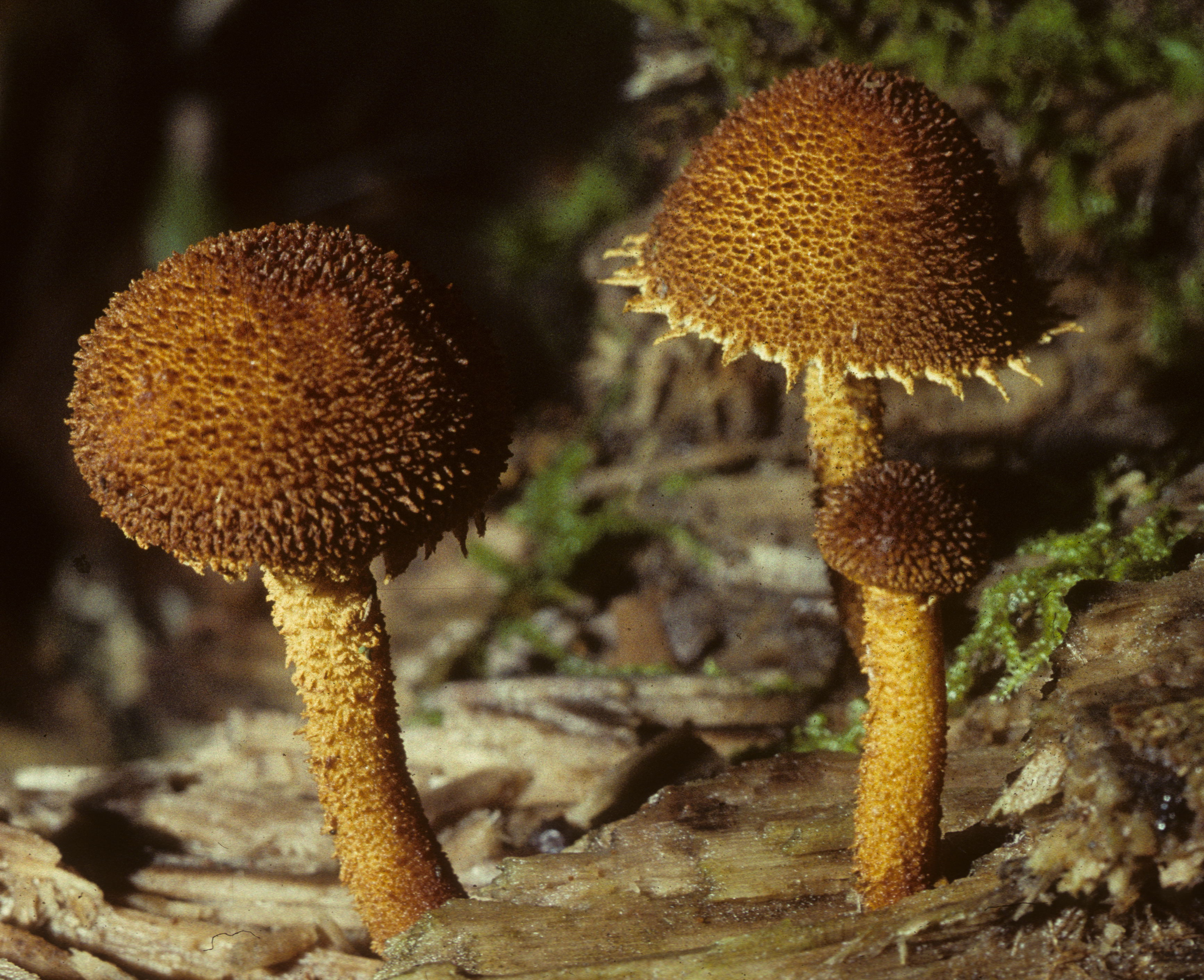

Scientific classification
- Domain: Eukaryota
- Kingdom: Fungi
- Division: Basidiomycota
- Class: Agaricomycetes
- Order: Agaricales
- Family: Tubariaceae
- Genus: Flammulaster
- Species: F. erinaceellus

Binomial name
- Flammulaster erinaceellus (Peck) Watling (1967)

Synonyms
- Agaricus detersibilis Peck (1876) [1875]; Agaricus erinaceellus Peck (1878) [1877]; Pholiota detersibilis Sacc. (1887); Pholiota erinaceella (Peck) Peck (1908); Phaeomarasmius erinaceellus (Peck) Singer [as 'erinaceella'] (1951) [1949]; Flocculina erinaceella (Peck) P.D.Orton (1960)

= Flammulaster erinaceellus =

Species of fungus

Flammulaster erinaceellus is a species of fungus in the agaric family Tubariaceae. It was first described in 1876 as Agaricus detersibilis by Charles Horton Peck. Roy Watling transferred it to Flammulaster in 1967.

The fruit body has a hemispherical to convex cap 1–3.5 cm (0.4–1.4 in) in diameter that is covered with small, erect, brownish scales that can be readily rubbed off. The gills have an adnexed attachment to the stipe. The stipe is up to 4.5 cm (1.8 in) long and 2 mm thick. It is either hollow, or stuffed with a pith-like mycelium. The spores measure 7.5–9 by 4–5 μm. The spore print is orangish brown.

Outside its genus, it can resemble Phaeomarasmius erinaceus, P. proximans, and Pholiota granulosa.

Fruiting occurs on barkless areas of logs in the woods in eastern North America.
