= Tubaria moseri =

Scientific classification
- Domain: Eukaryota
- Kingdom: Fungi
- Division: Basidiomycota
- Class: Agaricomycetes
- Order: Agaricales
- Family: Tubariaceae
- Genus: Tubaria
- Species: T. moseri

Binomial name
- Tubaria moseri Raithelh. (1974)

Species of fungus

Tubaria moseri is a species of agaric fungus in the family Tubariaceae. Found in Argentina, it was described as new to science in 1974 by Jörg H. Raithelhuber. The specific epithet moseri honours Austrian mycologist Meinhard Moser.
