= Pseudohiatula cyatheae =

Scientific classification
- Kingdom: Fungi
- Division: Basidiomycota
- Class: Agaricomycetes
- Order: Agaricales
- Family: Physalacriaceae
- Genus: Pseudohiatula
- Species: P. cyatheae

Binomial name
- Pseudohiatula cyatheae Singer

Species of fungus

Pseudohiatula cyatheae is a species of fungus in the family Physalacriaceae, and the type species of the genus Pseudohiatula. The species was first described by mycologist Rolf Singer in 1938.
