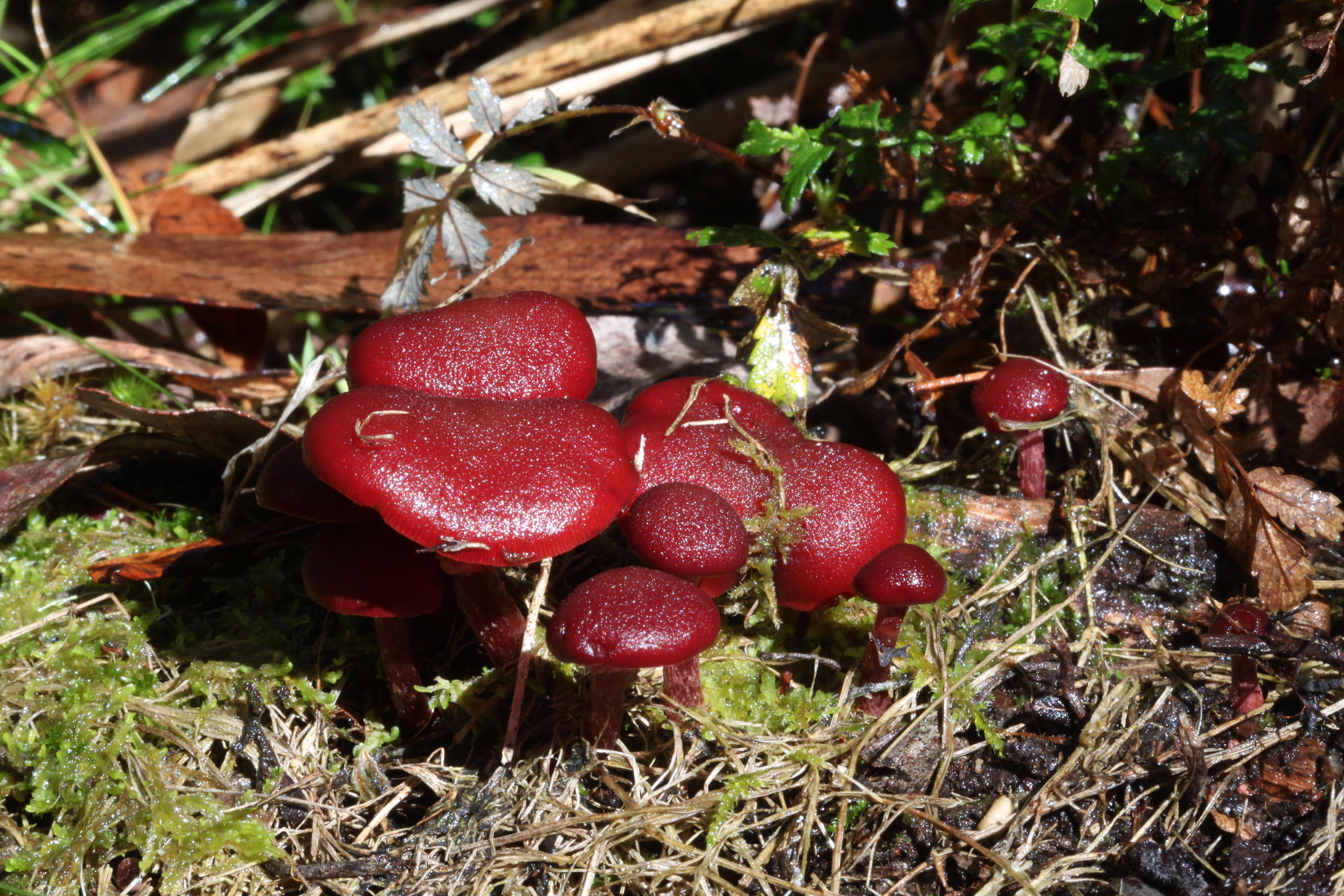

Scientific classification
- Domain: Eukaryota
- Kingdom: Fungi
- Division: Basidiomycota
- Class: Agaricomycetes
- Order: Agaricales
- Family: Tubariaceae
- Genus: Tubaria
- Species: T. rufofulva

Binomial name
- Tubaria rufofulva (Cleland) D.A.Reid & E.Horak (1983)

Synonyms
- Pholiota rufofulva Cleland (1927)

= Tubaria rufofulva =

Species of fungus

Tubaria rufofulva is a species of agaric fungus in the family Tubariaceae. Found in Australia, it was originally described in 1927 by John Burton Cleland as a species of Pholiota. The fungus was transferred to the genus Tubaria in 1983.
