= Phaeomyces =

Scientific classification
- Kingdom: Fungi
- Division: Basidiomycota
- Class: Agaricomycetes
- Order: Agaricales
- Family: Tubariaceae
- Genus: Phaeomyces; E. Horak

Type species
- Phaeomyces ibericus (G. Moreno & Esteve-Rav.) E. Horak

Species
- Phaeomyces dubiosus Phaeomyces ibericus

Genus of fungi

Phaeomyces is a genus of fungi in the family Tubariaceae. The genus contains two species found in Europe.
