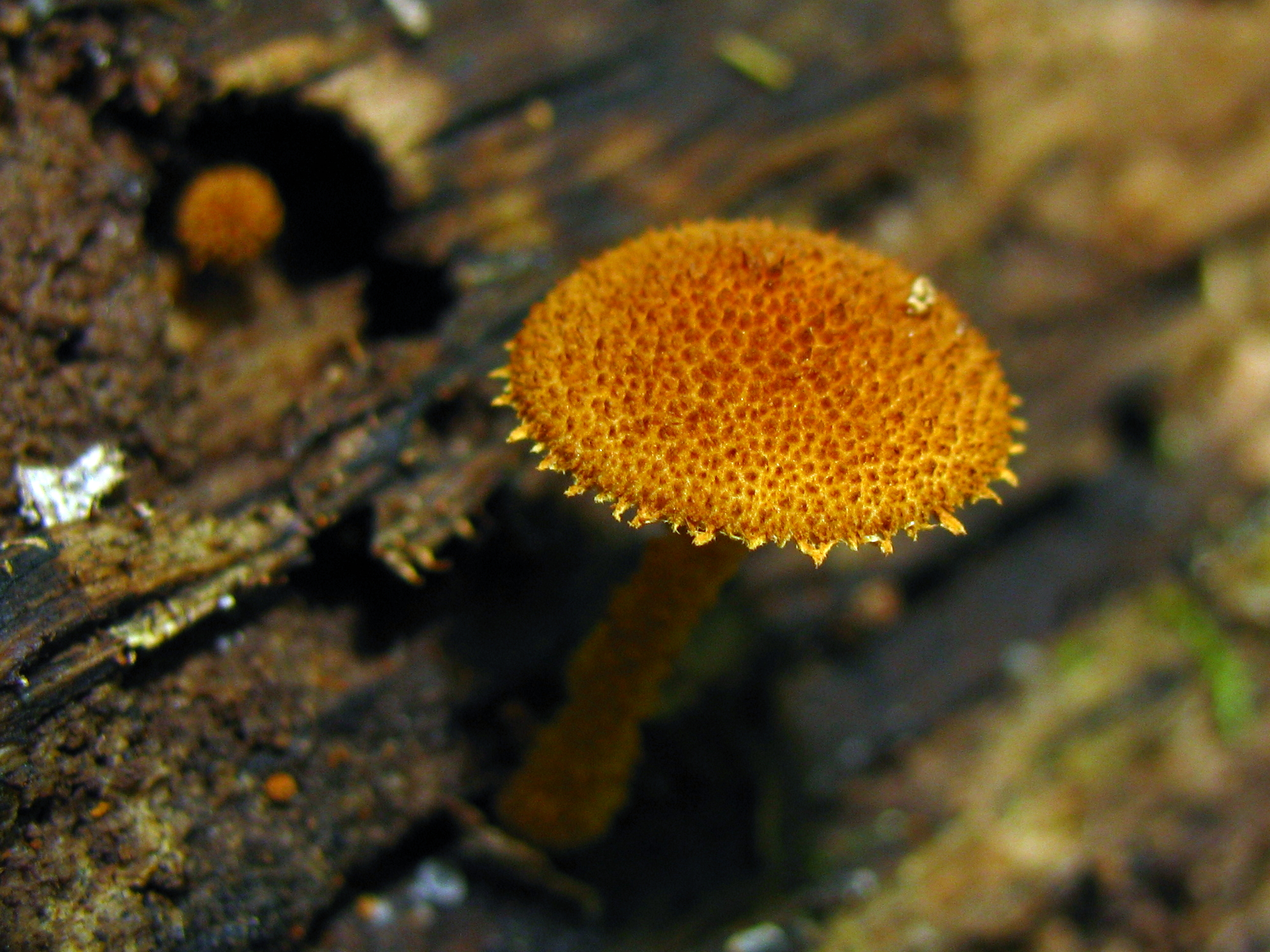
- Phaeomarasmius erinaceus

Scientific classification
- Kingdom: Fungi
- Division: Basidiomycota
- Class: Agaricomycetes
- Order: Agaricales
- Family: Tubariaceae
- Genus: Phaeomarasmius; Scherff.

Type species
- Phaeomarasmius excentricus Scherff.

= Phaeomarasmius =

Genus of fungi

Phaeomarasmius is a genus of fungi in the family Tubariaceae. It was formerly thought to belong in the family Inocybaceae. The genus has a widespread distribution, and contains about 20 species.
