= Cyptotrama nivea =

Scientific classification
- Domain: Eukaryota
- Kingdom: Fungi
- Division: Basidiomycota
- Class: Agaricomycetes
- Order: Agaricales
- Family: Physalacriaceae
- Genus: Cyptotrama
- Species: C. nivea

Binomial name
- Cyptotrama nivea Singer (1989)

Species of fungus

Cyptotrama nivea Mycological characteristics
- Gills on hymenium
- Cap is convex
- Hymenium is free
- Stipe is bare
- Ecology is saprotrophic
- Edibility is unknown

Cyptotrama nivea also known as Cyptotrama niveum is a species of mushroom producing fungus in the family Agaricaceae.

== Taxonomy ==
It was described in 1989 by the German mycologist Rolf Singer who classified it as Cyptotrama niveum however this is now regarded as an orthographic variant and the species is now called Cyptotrama nivea.

== Description ==
Cyptotrama nivea is a very small snow white mushroom with white, unchanging flesh.

Cap: 5mm wide and obtusely convex. The surface is snow white and finely frosted (pruinose) or finely hairy/woolly (sub-tomentose). Gills: Subdecurrent to decurrent, moderately crowded and white. Stem: 1.6cm wide and 1.3mm thick, running equally along the length. The surface is white with a silky, downy coating and a tomentose base. Spores: Ellipsoidal, smooth, hyaline, non-amyloid. 10.5-16.8 x 6.7-9.3 μm. Basidia: 25-31 x 8-13 μm. Four spored. Smell: Indistinct.

== Etymology ==
The specific epithet nivea or niveum derives from the Latin niveus meaning as white as snow.

== Habitat and distribution ==
The specimens studied by Singer were found growing solitary on fallen leaves in Igapó forests along the Igarapé Tarumãzinho river in Brazil.
