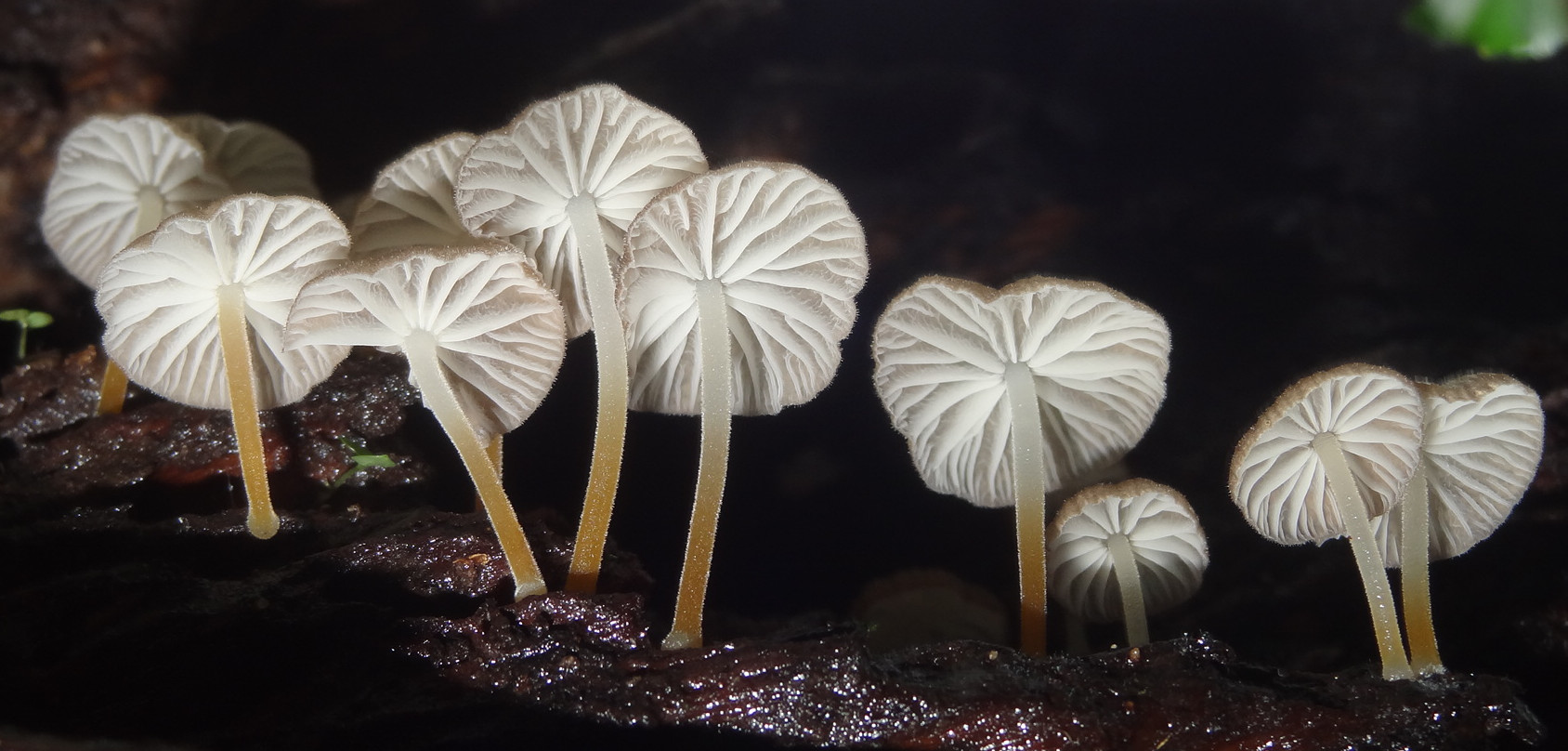
- Pseudohiatula irrorata in Columbia

Scientific classification
- Kingdom: Fungi
- Division: Basidiomycota
- Class: Agaricomycetes
- Order: Agaricales
- Family: Physalacriaceae
- Genus: Pseudohiatula (Singer) Singer (1938)

Type species
- Pseudohiatula cyatheae Singer (1938)

Synonyms
- Mycena subgen. Pseudo-Hiatula Singer (1936); Mycena subgen. Pseudohiatula Singer (1936)

= Pseudohiatula =

Genus of fungi

Pseudohiatula is a genus of fungi in the family Physalacriaceae. It was originally described as a subgenus of Mycena by the mycologist Rolf Singer before he moved to its own genus two years later. It was formerly thought to belong in the family Tricholomataceae, but a molecular phylogenetics study found it to be more closely The genus Cyptotrama in the Physalacriaceae. Rolf Singer had previously hypothesized these two genera to be closely related based on morphological features in 1986. It contains five species that are widely distributed in tropical areas.
