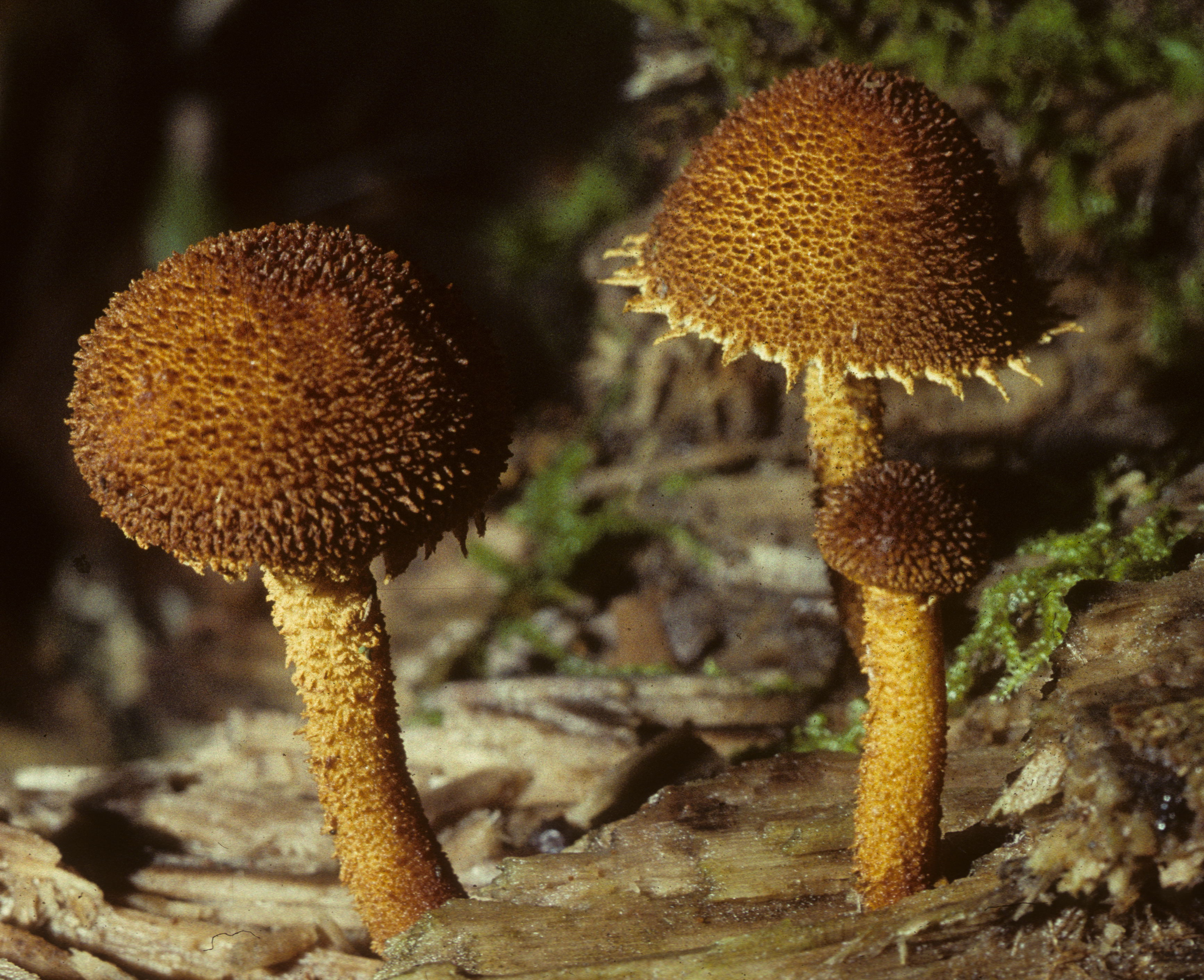
- Flammulaster erinaceellus

Scientific classification
- Domain: Eukaryota
- Kingdom: Fungi
- Division: Basidiomycota
- Class: Agaricomycetes
- Order: Agaricales
- Family: Tubariaceae
- Genus: Flammulaster; Earle (1909)

Type species
- Flammulaster carpophilus (Fr.) Earle (1909)

Synonyms
- Flocculina P.D.Orton (1960)

= Flammulaster =

Genus of fungi

Flammulaster is a genus of agaricoid fungi in the family Tubariaceae. It was formerly thought to belong in the family Inocybaceae. The genus has a widespread distribution, and contains 20 species. Flammulaster was circumscribed by American mycologist Franklin Sumner Earle in 1909.

== Species ==
- Flammulaster carpophilus
- Flammulaster disseminatus
- Flammulaster erinaceellus
- Flammulaster ferrugineus
- Flammulaster foliicola
- Flammulaster fusisporus
- Flammulaster gracilis
- Flammulaster granulosus
- Flammulaster limulatus (Fr.) Watling, 1967
- Flammulaster muricatus
- Flammulaster pulveraceus
- Flammulaster rhombosporus
- Flammulaster saliciphilus
- Flammulaster siparius
- Flammulaster speireoides
- Flammulaster wieslandri
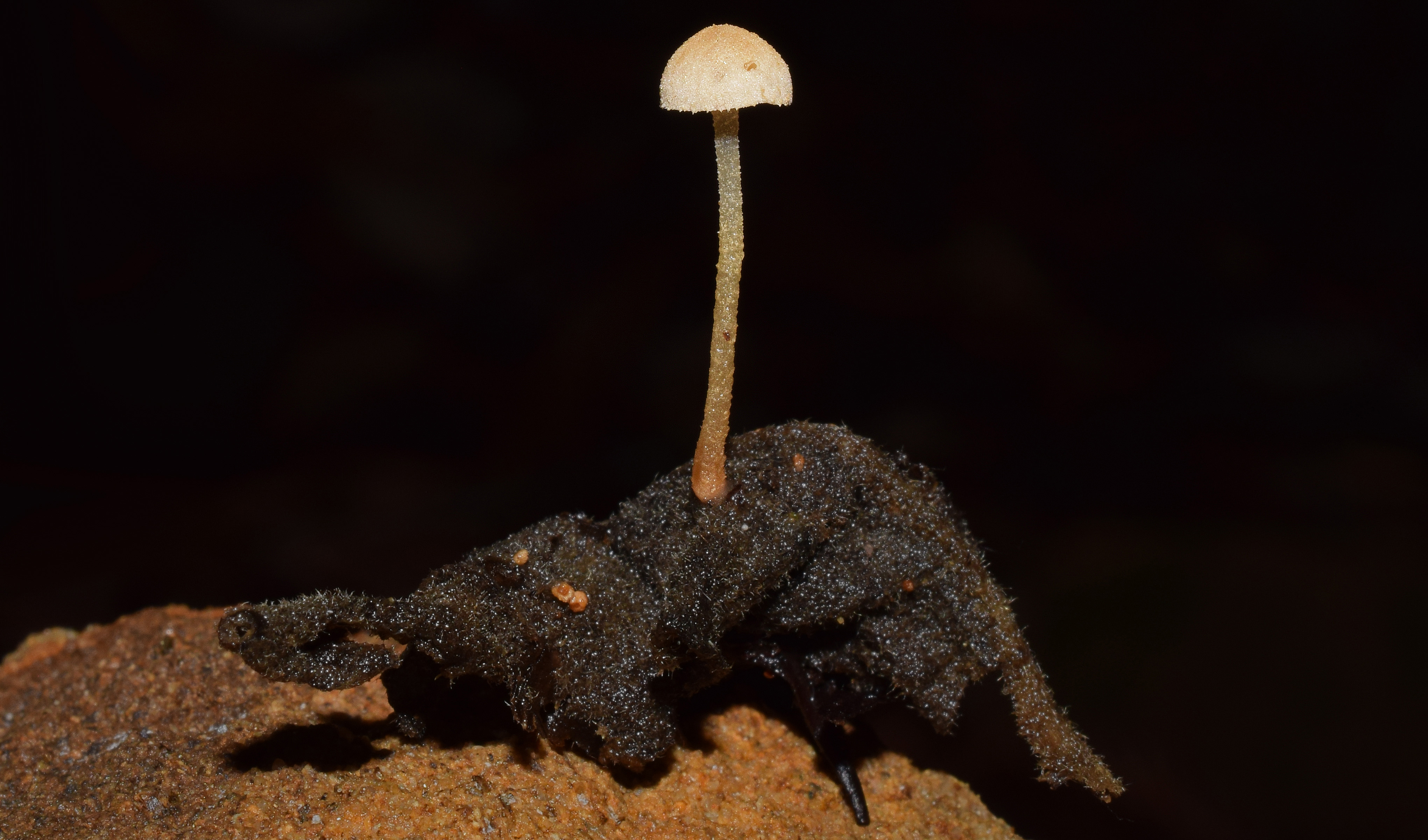
Flammulaster rhombosporus
