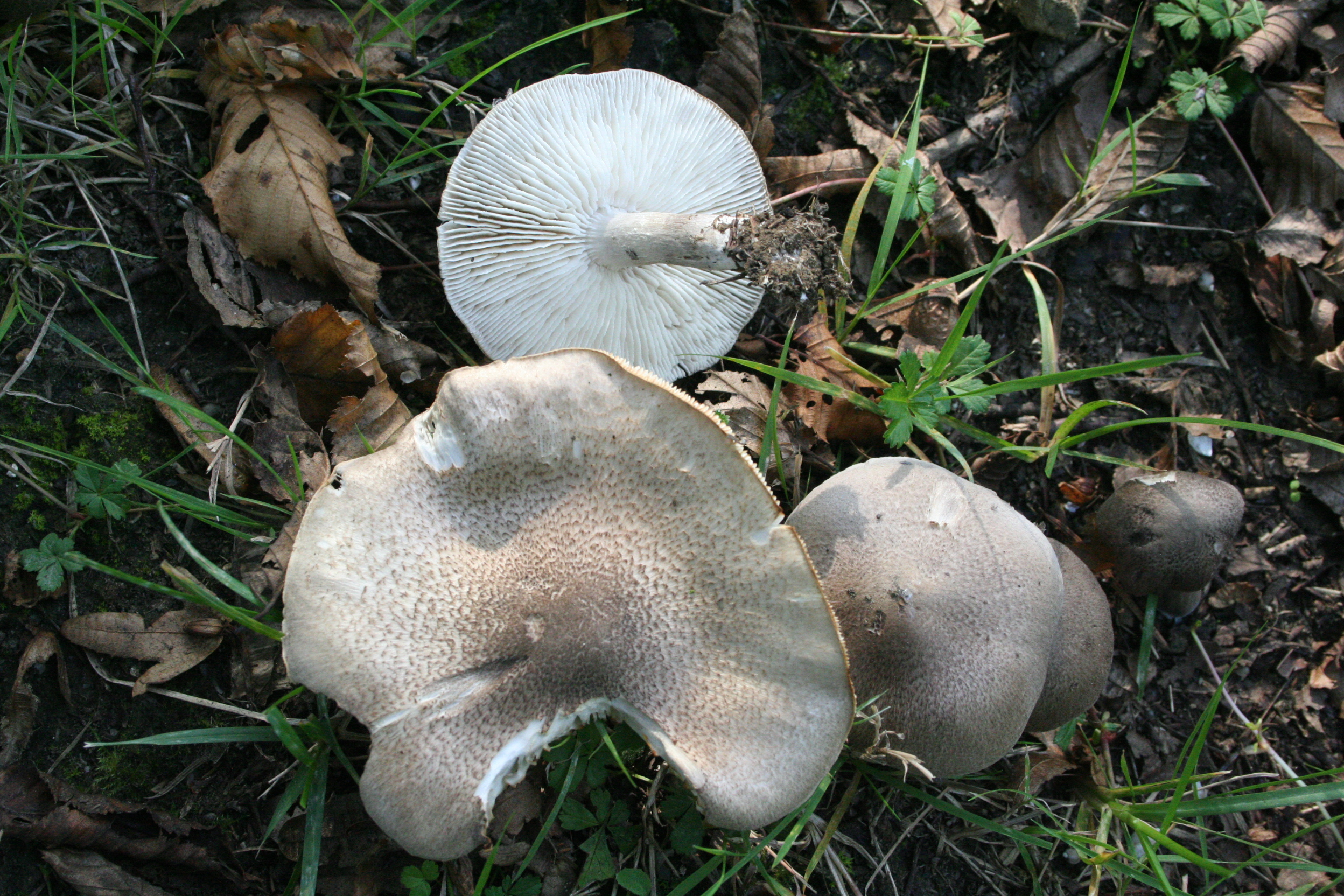

Scientific classification
- Kingdom: Fungi
- Division: Basidiomycota
- Class: Agaricomycetes
- Order: Agaricales
- Family: Tricholomataceae
- Genus: Tricholoma
- Species: T. scalpturatum

Binomial name
- Tricholoma scalpturatum (Fr.) Quél. (1872)

Synonyms
- Agaricus chrysites Jungh. (1830); Agaricus scalpturatus Fr. (1838); Gyrophila argyracea var. chrysites (Jungh.) Quél. (1886); Tricholoma argyraceum subsp. chrysites (Jungh.) Sacc. (1887); Tricholoma argyraceum var. chrysites (Jungh.) Gillet (1874); Tricholoma chrysites (Jungh.) Quél.

= Tricholoma scalpturatum =

Species of fungus

Tricholoma scalpturatum is a species of agaric fungus in the family Tricholomataceae. Found in Europe, it grows in a mycorrhizal association with deciduous trees including Quercus, Fagus, Tilia, and Populus, and occasionally with Pinus.

== See also ==
- List of Tricholoma species
