= Cyptotrama pauper =

Scientific classification
- Domain: Eukaryota
- Kingdom: Fungi
- Division: Basidiomycota
- Class: Agaricomycetes
- Order: Agaricales
- Family: Physalacriaceae
- Genus: Cyptotrama
- Species: C. pauper

Binomial name
- Cyptotrama pauper Singer (1989)

Species of fungus

Cyptotrama pauper Mycological characteristics
- Gills on hymenium
- Cap is convex
- Hymenium is adnate
- Stipe is bare
- Ecology is saprotrophic
- Edibility is unknown

Cyptotrama pauper also known as Cyptotrama pauperum is a species of mushroom producing fungus in the family Agaricaceae.

== Taxonomy ==
It was described in 1989 by the German mycologist Rolf Singer who classified it as Cyptotrama pauperum however this is now regarded as an orthographic variant and the species is now called Cyptotrama pauper.

== Description ==
Cyptotrama pauper is a small red-pink mushroom with thin and fragile white or pale flesh.

Cap: 0.8-3.7 cm wide and convex to flat or with upturned edges. The surface is red but fades to pink with age, it is smooth or with finely appressed or fibrillose scales. It is not hygrophanous or viscid. Gills: Adnate, crowded and white. Stem: 1.6-3.8 cm long and 1–2.5mm thick. The surface is pink and smooth but pale or white and silky towards the apex and it runs equally or with a slight taper towards the top. The interior is a hollow tube (tubulose) and the base has silky white mycelium present. Spores: Fusoid or oblong, hyaline, non-amyloid. 9.5-12 x 4.7-5.3 μm. Basidia: 37-40 x 8-8.5 μm. Four spored. Smell: Indistinct.

== Habitat and distribution ==
The specimens studied by Singer were found growing on the fallen trunk of a Dicotyledonous tree in the tropical forest on the road between Manaus and Itacoatiara, Brazil.

== Similar species ==
Singer states that the species is related to Cyptotrama hygrocyboides but is distinguished by the lack of pleurocystidia.
