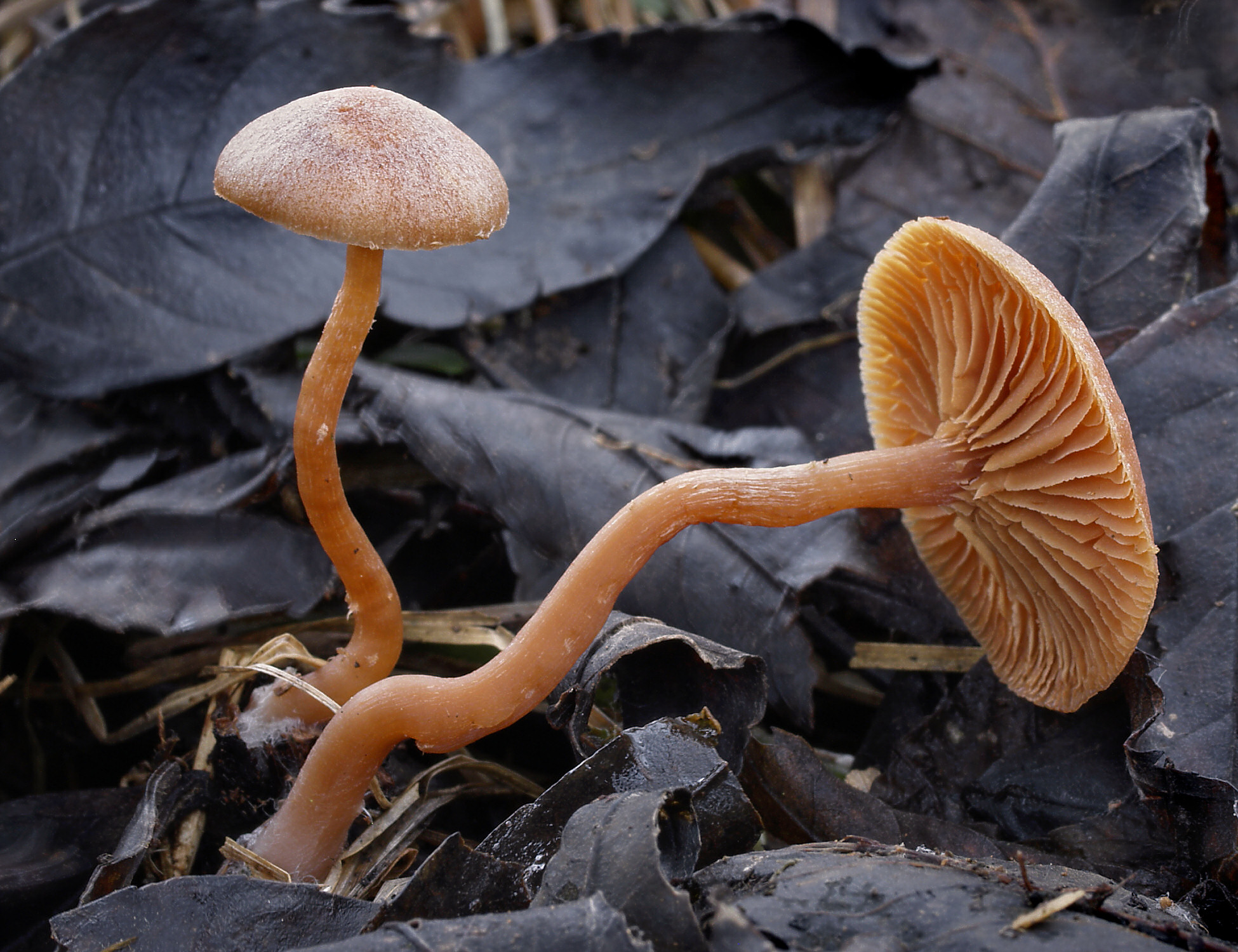
- Tubaria furfuracea

Scientific classification
- Kingdom: Fungi
- Division: Basidiomycota
- Class: Agaricomycetes
- Order: Agaricales
- Family: Tubariaceae
- Genus: Tubaria (W.G.Sm.) Gillet (1876)

Type species
- Tubaria furfuracea (Pers.) Gillet (1876)

Synonyms
- Agaricus subgen. Tubaria W.G.Sm. (1870)

= Tubaria =

Genus of fungi in the order Agaricales

Tubaria is a genus of fungi in the family Tubariaceae. The genus is widely distributed, especially in temperate regions. Tubaria was originally named as a subgenus of Agaricus by Worthington George Smith in 1870. Claude Casimir Gillet promoted it to generic status in 1876. The mushrooms produced by species in this genus are small- to medium-sized with caps ranging in color from pale pinkish-brown to reddish-brown, and often with remnants of the partial veil adhering to the margin. Mushrooms fruit on rotting wood, or, less frequently, in the soil. There are no species in the genus that are recommended for consumption.

== Species ==
As of January 2016, the nomenclatural authority Index Fungorum accepts 72 species of Tubaria:

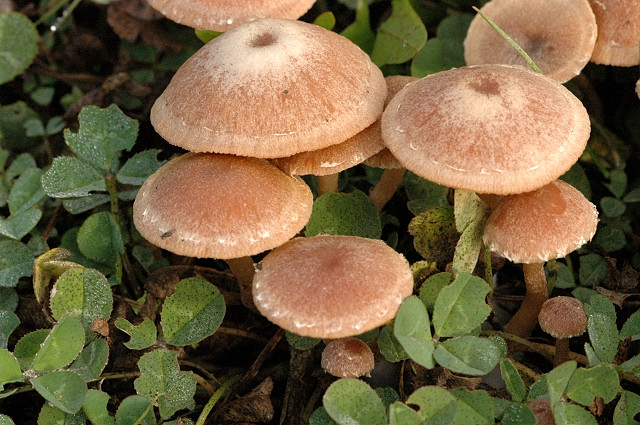
T. conspersa

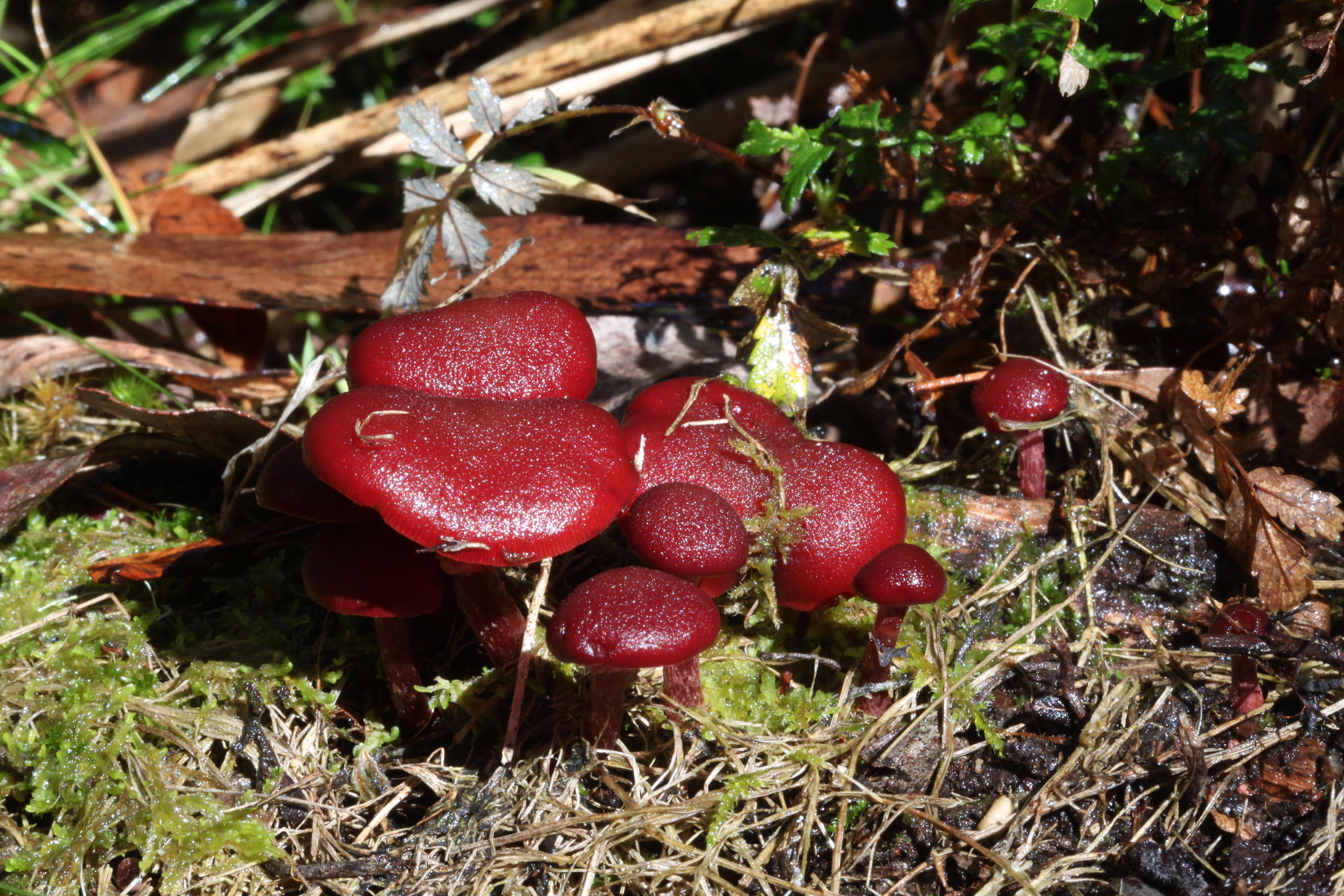
T. rufofulva

- Tubaria abramsii Murrill 1917
- Tubaria agrocyboides Singer 1941
- Tubaria alabamensis Murrill 1917
- Tubaria albostipitata D.A.Reid 1972 – United Kingdom
- Tubaria asperata Henn. 1903
- Tubaria bellatula Herp. 1912
- Tubaria bispora Matheny, P.-A.Moreau, M.A.Neves & Vellinga 2007
- Tubaria bogoriensis Henn. 1899
- Tubaria canescens Peck 1894
- Tubaria caricicola Henn. 1900
- Tubaria chillanensis Henn. 1900
- Tubaria cisneroana Speg. 1898
- Tubaria cistophila Cheype 1997
- Tubaria confragosa (Fr.) Harmaja 1978 – United Kingdom
- Tubaria confragosula (Singer) Contu 2000
- Tubaria conspersa (Pers.) Fayod 1889 – Europe
- Tubaria crenulata Murrill 1917
- Tubaria decurrens (Peck) Murrill 1917
- Tubaria deformata Peck 1898
- Tubaria dispersa (L.) Singer 1961 – United Kingdom
- Tubaria djurensis Henn. 1891
- Tubaria earlei Murrill 1917
- Tubaria egestosa Herp. 1912
- Tubaria ferruginea Maire ex E.Horak & P.-A.Moreau 2005
- Tubaria fimiseda Speg. 1898
- Tubaria fiveashiana Grgur. 1997 – Australia
- Tubaria furfuracea (Pers.) Gillet 1876 – Europe, Australia
- Tubaria fuscifolia Murrill 1945
- Tubaria hololeuca Kühner ex E.Horak & P.-A.Moreau 2005
- Tubaria hookeri (Speg.) E.Horak 1980
- Tubaria incospicua Contu 1990
- Tubaria infundibuliformis Henn. & E.Nyman 1899
- Tubaria jaffuelii (Speg.) Singer 1969
- Tubaria lilliputiana P.-A.Moreau & Borgarino 2007
- Tubaria lithocarpicola M.Zang 2001 – China
- Tubaria mammosa Henn. 1899
- Tubaria minima J.E.Lange 1940
- Tubaria minutalis Romagn. 1937 – United Kingdom
- Tubaria moseri Raithelh. 1974
- Tubaria oblongospora Herp. 1912
- Tubaria olivaceonana (Singer) Raithelh. 2004
- Tubaria omphaliiformis (Velen.) Wichanský 1960
- Tubaria ovoidospora Kalamees & Faizova 1983
- Tubaria pallescens Peck 1895
- Tubaria pallidispora J.E.Lange 1940 – United Kingdom
- Tubaria pentstemonis Singer 1958
- Tubaria pinicola L.Remy 1965
- Tubaria platensis Speg. 1898
- Tubaria praecox Murrill 1917
- Tubaria praestans (Romagn.) M.M.Moser 1978
- Tubaria pseudoconspersa Romagn. 1943
- Tubaria pseudoripartites Singer 1952
- Tubaria punicea (A.H.Sm. & Hesler) Ammirati, Matheny & P.-A.Moreau 2007
- Tubaria romagnesiana Arnolds 1982 – United Kingdom
- Tubaria rufofulva (Cleland) D.A.Reid & E.Horak 1983 – Tasmania
- Tubaria saharanpurensis Henn. 1901
- Tubaria segestria (Fr.) Boud. 1906
- Tubaria serrulata (Cleland) Bougher & Matheny 2007
- Tubaria stagnicola (Britzelm.) Sacc. & Traverso 1911
- Tubaria strigipes (Cooke & Massee) McAlpine 1895
- Tubaria strophosa Singer 1969
- Tubaria subcrenulata Murrill 1941
- Tubaria substagnina Rick 1920
- Tubaria tenuis Peck 1896
- Tubaria trigonophylla (Lasch) Fayod 1874
- Tubaria umbonata S.Lundell 1953
- Tubaria umbrina Maire 1928
- Tubaria velata Dennis 1961
- Tubaria venosa Henn. 1897
- Tubaria verruculospora Pegler 1977 – Uganda; Zambia
- Tubaria vinicolor (Peck) Ammirati, Matheny & Vellinga 2007
- Tubaria virescens Noordel. & K.B.Vrinda 2007

== See also ==
- List of Agaricales genera
