= Gilletiella =

Scientific classification
- Kingdom: Fungi
- Division: Ascomycota
- Class: Dothideomycetes
- Subclass: incertae sedis
- Genus: Gilletiella; Sacc. & P.Syd. (1899)

Type species
- Gilletiella chusqueae (Pat.) Sacc. & P.Syd. (1899)

Species
- G. apiahyna G. chusqueae G. late-maculans

Genus of fungi

Gilletiella is a genus of fungi in the class Dothideomycetes.

The genus name of Gilletiella is in honour of Claude Casimir Gillet (1806 – 1896), who was a French botanist and mycologist. He initially trained as a medical doctor and veterinarian.

The genus was circumscribed by Pier Andrea Saccardo and Paul Sydow in Syll. Fung. vol.14 on page 691 in 1899.

The relationship of this taxon to other taxa within the class is unknown (incertae sedis).

== See also ==
- List of Dothideomycetes genera incertae sedis
