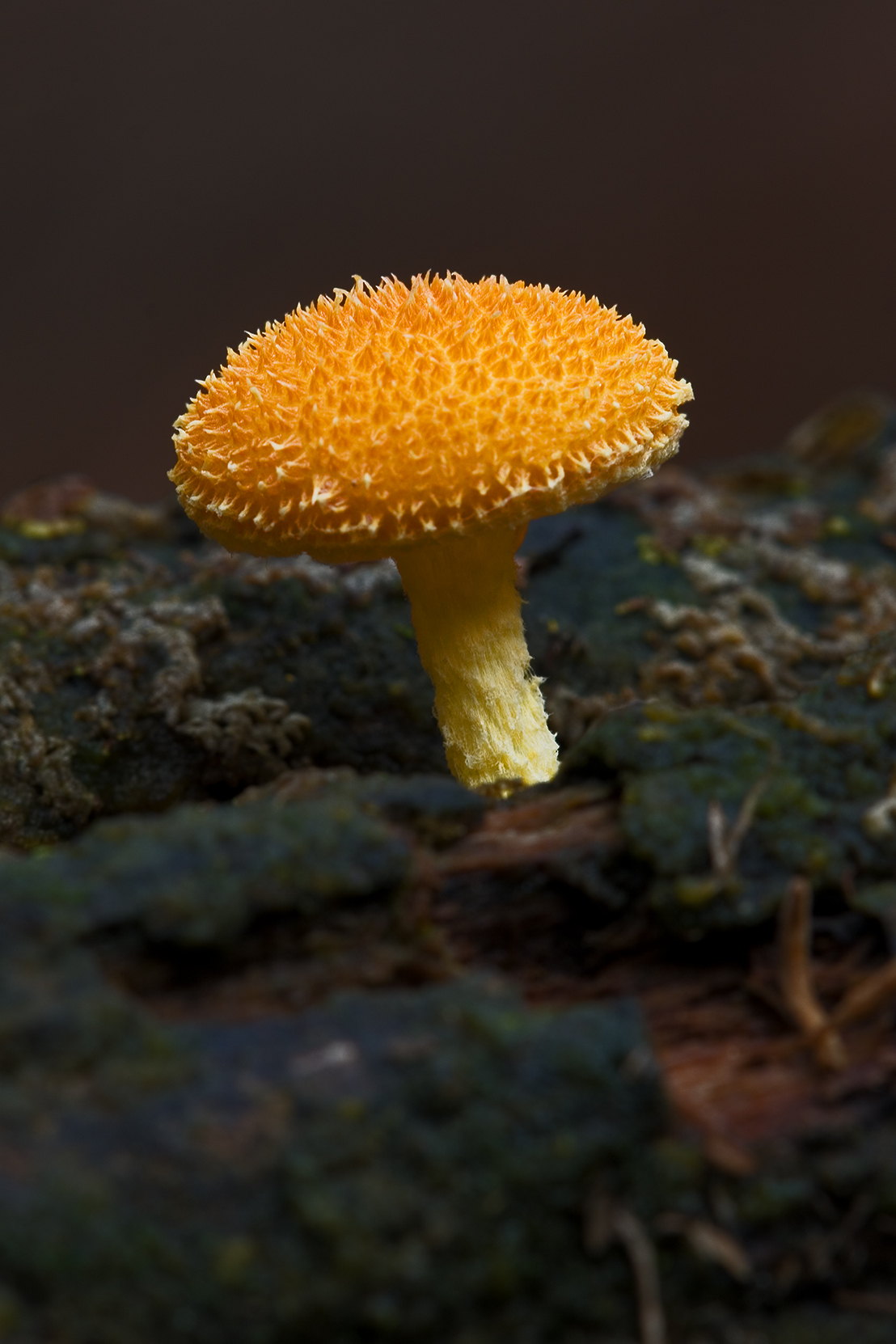

Scientific classification
- Kingdom: Fungi
- Division: Basidiomycota
- Class: Agaricomycetes
- Order: Agaricales
- Family: Physalacriaceae
- Genus: Cyptotrama
- Species: C. asprata

Binomial name
- Cyptotrama asprata (Berk.) Redhead & Ginns (1980)

Synonyms
- Agaricus aspratus Berk. (1847); Lepiota asprata (Berk.) Sacc. (1887); Armillaria asprata (Berk.) Petch (1910); Xerula asprata (Berk.) Aberdeen (1962); Xerulina asprata (Berk.) Pegler (1972)

= Cyptotrama asprata =

Species of fungus

Cyptotrama asprata
- Mycological characteristics
- Gills on hymenium
- Cap is convex
- Hymenium is adnate or decurrent
- Stipe has a ring or is bare
- Spore print is white
- Ecology is saprotrophic
- Edibility is inedible

Cyptotrama asprata (alternatively spelled aspratum), commonly known as the golden-scruffy collybia or spiny woodknight is a saprobic species of mushroom in the family Physalacriaceae. This fungus has had a varied taxonomical history, having been placed in fourteen genera before finally settling in Cyptotrama.

It is characterized by the bright orange to yellow cap that in young specimens is covered with tufts of fibrils resembling small spikes. This species is differentiated from several other similar members of genus by variations in cap color, and spore size and shape. It is widely distributed in tropical regions of the world.

== History ==
This species was first described from Ceylon by English naturalist Miles Joseph Berkeley in 1847; soon after (1852), specimens were collected from South Carolina USA. Later, the fungus was described under a variety of names: Lentinus chrysopeplus from Cuba; Agaricus sabriusculus and Agaricus lacunosa from New York; Collybia lacunosa from Michigan; and Omphalia scabriuscula in Connecticut. As Canadian mycologists Redhead and Ginns explain in a 1980 article on the species, since its original 1847 description, C. asprata has been given 28 names, and placed in 14 different genera.

== Description ==
The cap is 0.6 to 2.7 centimetres (0.2 to 1.1 in) in diameter, convex to cushion-shaped. The cap surface is dry, and younger specimens are covered with characteristic spikes; as the spikes break up with age, they tend to look more hairy or woolly. Older specimens typically have the surface features worn off. The cap margin tends to be rolled inwards when young, gradually becoming straight with maturity. The color of the cap is bright or pale yellow, increasing in intensity towards the center of the cap. C. asprata has a web-like ring that soon disappears.

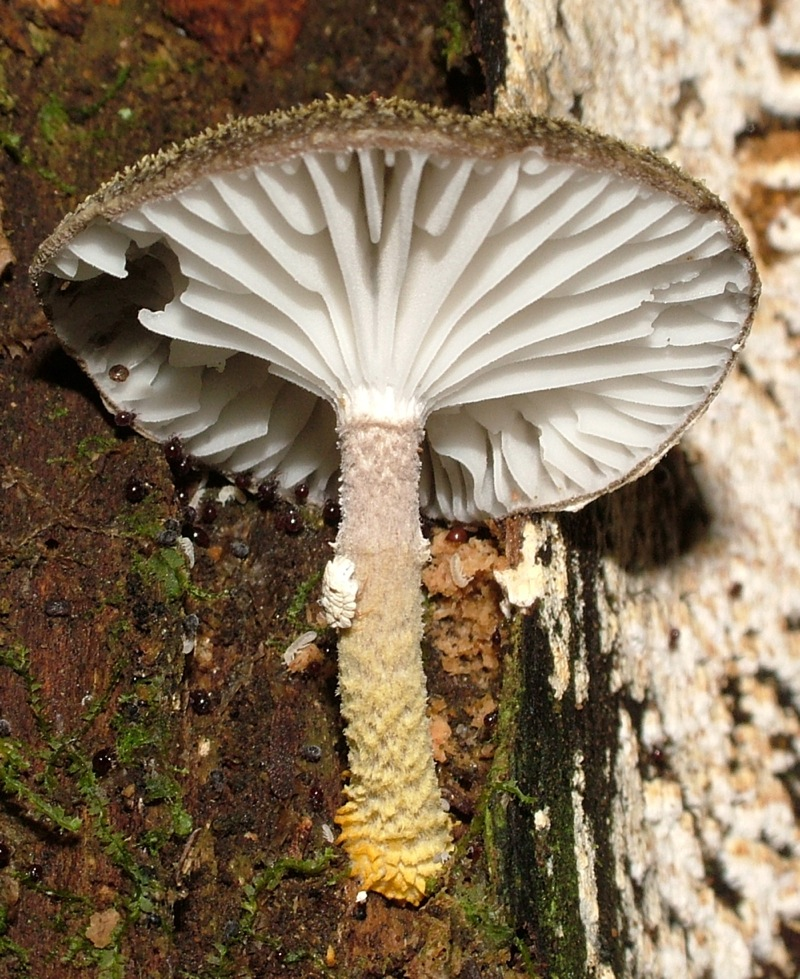
Gill attachment

The gills, pale yellow to white in color, are distantly spaced and have an adnate (squarely attached) or short decurrent (running down the length) attachment to the stem; they feel greasy when dried and crushed. The stem is 1 to 6.7 cm (0.4 to 2.6 in) long by 0.2 to 0.4 cm (0.1 to 0.2 in) thick at the stem apex; the stem is slightly thicker towards the base, and may be covered with hyphae that appear woolly (flocculose) or hairy (fibrillose). The surface of the stem may also be scaly – especially towards the base – or it may be covered with very small particles (granular). The flesh of this mushroom is white or pale yellow, with no distinctive taste or odor. The spore print is white. It is considered inedible.

=== Similar species ===
Many other members of genus Cyptotrama are similar in appearance and differ from C. asprata by only one or two readily observable features. For example, C. granulosa is bright yellowish-brown (rather than bright or pale yellow in C. asprata); C. lachnocephala is ochre-colored; C. deseynesiana is cream-colored with brown scales; C. verruculosa has a "copper-rust-brown" cap; C. costesii has olive-colored pigments. Species may also be distinguished by differences in spore size and shape, although a considerable size range has been noted for C. asprata spores. C. chrysopepla and Heliocybe sulcata are also similar.

=== Microscopic features ===
Spores are thin-walled, smooth, and ellipsoidal or oval in shape. Viewed with a microscope, they appear translucent (hyaline), and stain red or blue with Melzer's reagent (inamyloid). Their dimensions are typically 7–10 by 5–7 μm; the spores contain a single large oil droplet. The spore-bearing cells, the basidia, are club-shaped, two- to four-spored, and 25–30 by 5–7 μm. The presence of sterile cells called pleurocystidia (large cells found on the gill face in some mushrooms) is uncommon; specimens may contain few or abundant cheilocystidia (large sterile cells found on the gill edge) that are club-shaped, thin-walled and 39–87.5 by 8.5–16 μm in size.

== Habitat and distribution ==
Cyptotrama asprata is a saprobic fungus, and grows on the decaying wood of deciduous and coniferous trees. Host species include white fir (Abies concolor), sugar maple (Acer saccharum) and other maple (Acer) species, grey alder (Alnus oblongifolia), beech (Fagus) species, spruce (Picea) species, ponderosa pine (Pinus ponderosa) and other pine (Pinus) species, poplar (Populus) and oak (Quercus) species. In temperate North America, specimens are typically collected between July through September.

The species has a pantropical distribution, and is widely distributed in tropical regions of the world. It has been collected from Australia, southeastern Canada, China, Costa Rica, India, Hawaii, New Zealand, Japan, and the Russian Far East. It is absent from Europe and northwestern North America.
