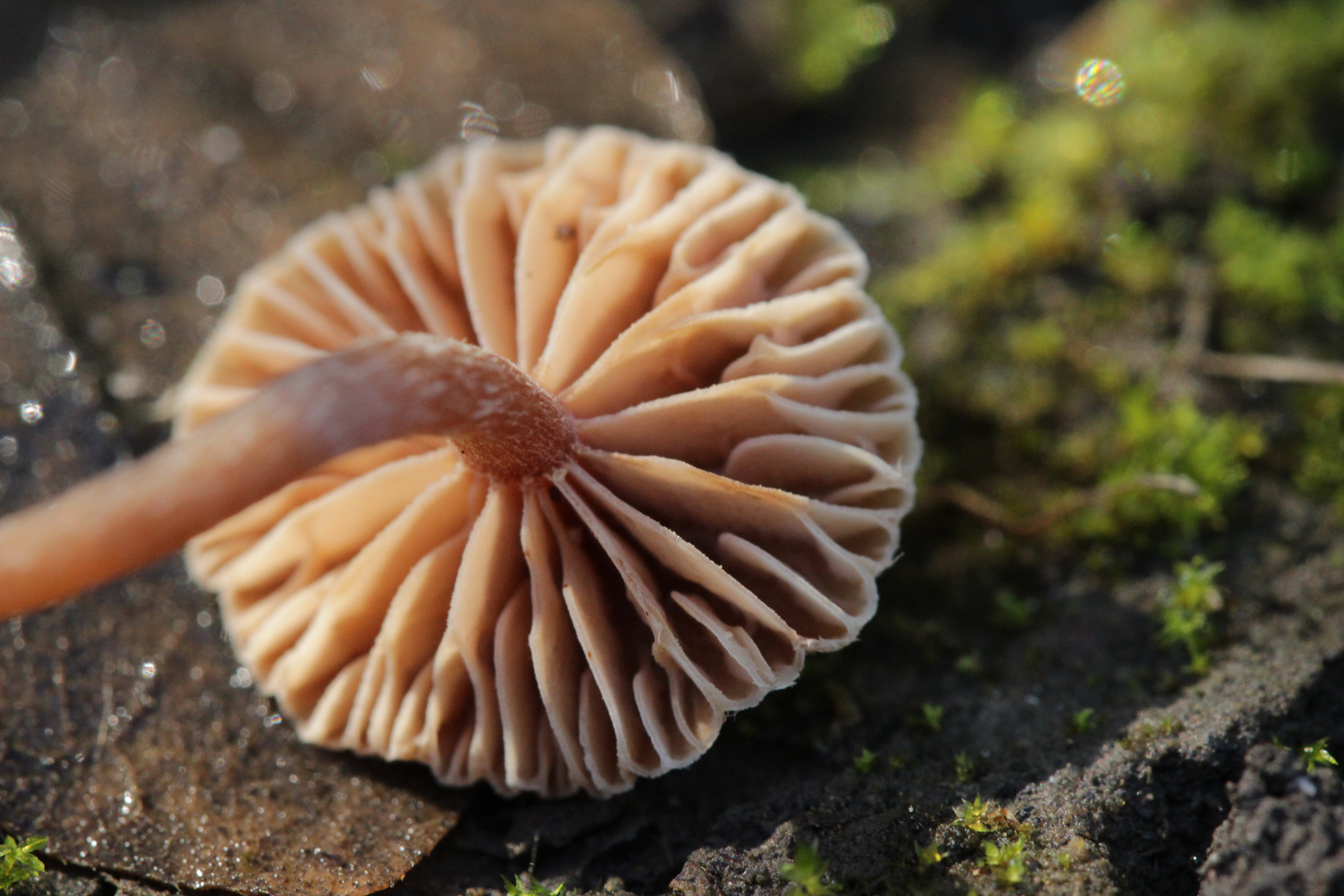

Scientific classification
- Kingdom: Fungi
- Division: Basidiomycota
- Class: Agaricomycetes
- Order: Agaricales
- Family: Tubariaceae
- Genus: Tubaria
- Species: T. conspersa

Binomial name
- Tubaria conspersa Pers. (Fayod)

Synonyms
- Agaricus conspersus Pers. Naucoria conspersa (Pers.) P. Kumm. Inocybe conspersa (Pers.) Roze.

= Tubaria conspersa =

Species of fungus

Tubaria conspersa
- Mycological characteristics
- Gills on hymenium
- Cap is convex or flat
- Hymenium is adnate
- Stipe is bare
- Spore print is brown
- Ecology is saprotrophic
- Edibility is unknown or inedible

Tubaria conspersa, commonly known as the felted twiglet, is a species of mushroom in the genus Tubaria. It grows on duff and woody debris.

== Taxonomy and distribution ==
Tubaria conspersa was first described in 1800 by Christiaan Hendrik Persoon as Agaricus conspersus. In 1889, Victor Fayod transferred it into the genus Tubaria. While Tubaria conspersa is found in both Europe and the Pacific Northwest, the European and Pacific Northwestern species are thought to be distinct.

== Description ==
The convex to flat cap of Tubaria conspersa is about 7 millimeters to 2.5 centimeters in diameter. It is tannish in color, and the gills are adnate. The scaly stipe is the same color as the cap. The spore print is pale brown.
