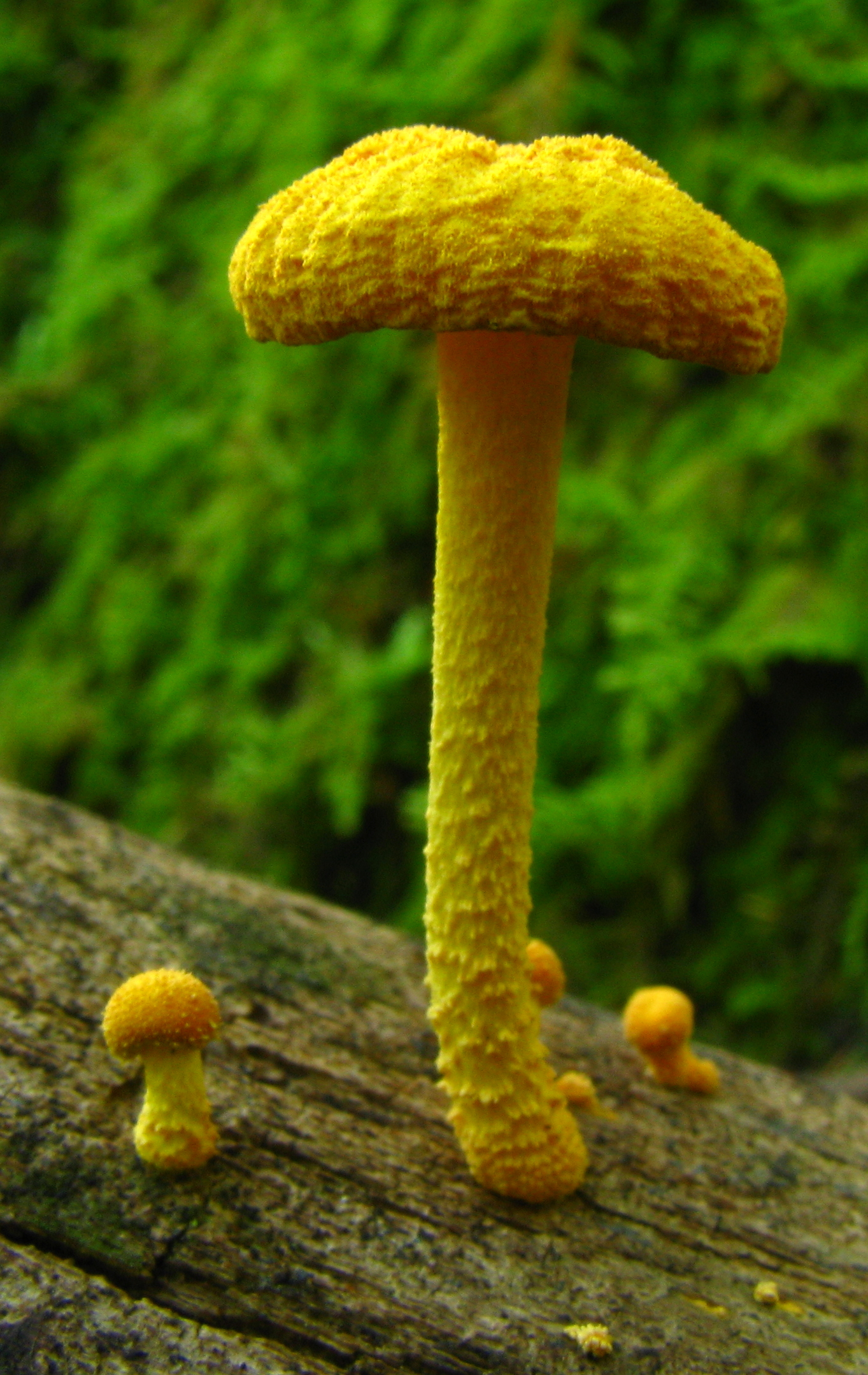

Scientific classification
- Domain: Eukaryota
- Kingdom: Fungi
- Division: Basidiomycota
- Class: Agaricomycetes
- Order: Agaricales
- Family: Physalacriaceae
- Genus: Cyptotrama
- Species: C. chrysopepla

Binomial name
- Cyptotrama chrysopepla (Berk. & M.A.Curtis) Singer (1973)

Synonyms
- Lentinus chrysopeplus Berk. & M.A.Curtis (1868)

= Cyptotrama chrysopepla =

Species of fungus

Cyptotrama chrysopepla Mycological characteristics
- Gills on hymenium
- Cap is convex or flat
- Stipe is bare
- Spore print is white
- Edibility is unknown

Cyptotrama chrysopepla is a small, bright golden yellow, dry cap stalk mushroom. Its gills color ranges from white to yellow. It grows on wood. The cap is convex to flat, often lined or furrowed near the margin and the surface can be dull to powdery or scaly. Gills are either broadly attached or extending down from the stalk. The spore print is white. They can be found in few to many numbers. Its edibility is unknown. Its common name is golden coincap.
