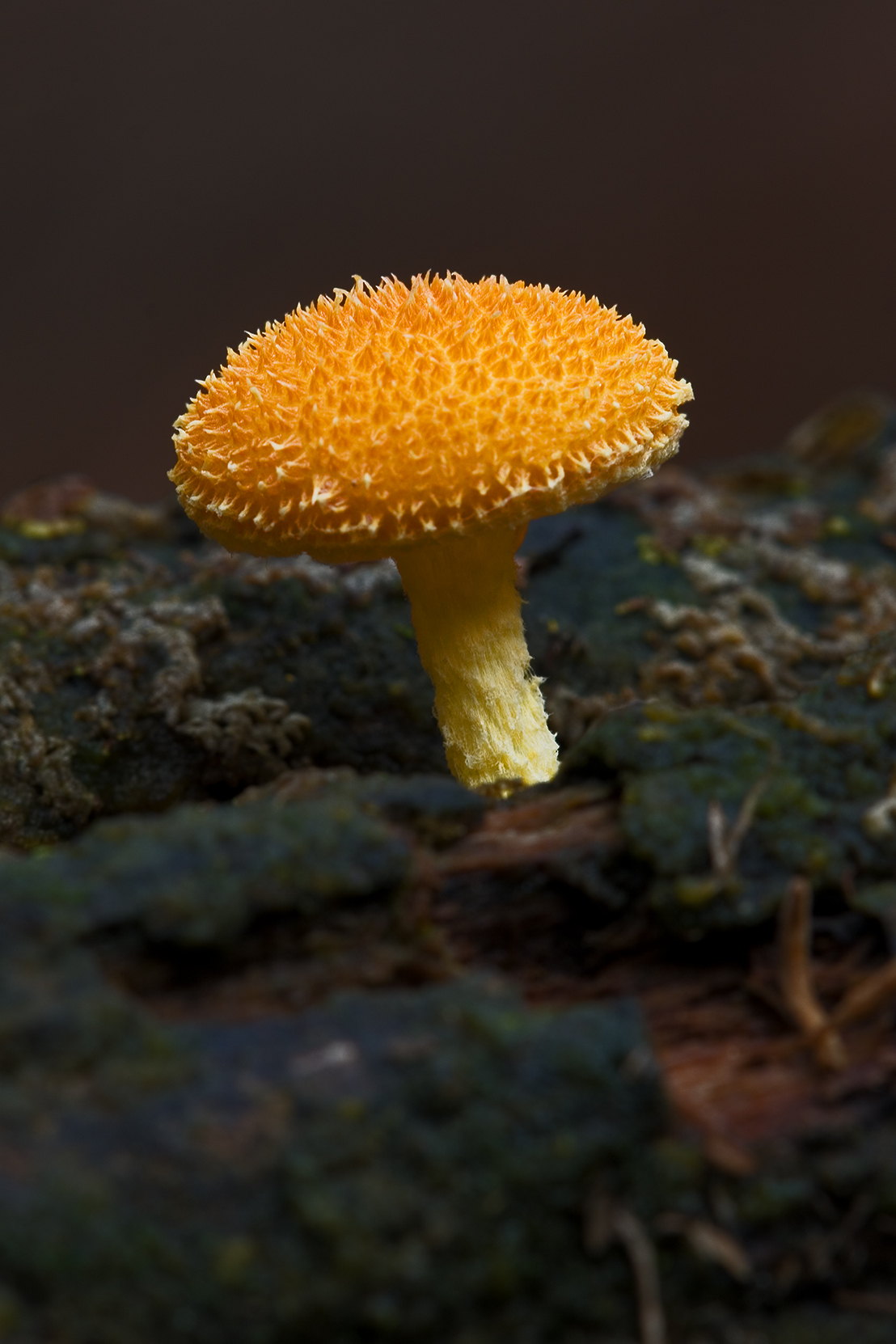
- Cyptotrama asprata

Scientific classification
- Kingdom: Fungi
- Division: Basidiomycota
- Class: Agaricomycetes
- Order: Agaricales
- Family: Physalacriaceae
- Genus: Cyptotrama; Singer (1960)

Type species
- Cyptotrama macrobasidia Singer (1960)

= Cyptotrama =

Genus of fungi

Cyptotrama is a genus of mushrooms in the family Physalacriaceae.

== Species ==
- Cyptotrama asprata (Berk.) Redhead & Ginns (1980)
- Cyptotrama chrysopepla (Berk. & M.A. Curtis) Singer (1973)
- Cyptotrama costesii (Speg.) Singer (1973)
- Cyptotrama dennisii Singer (1973)
- Cyptotrama depauperata Singer (1977)
- Cyptotrama deseynesiana (Pegler) Redhead & Ginns (1980)
- Cyptotrama fagiphila Vila, Pérez-Butrόn and P.-A. Moreau (2015)
- Cyptotrama granulosa (Romell) Redhead & Ginns (1980)
- Cyptotrama hygrocyboides Singer (1969)
- Cyptotrama lachnocephala (Pat.) Singer (1973)
- Cyptotrama macrobasidia Singer (1960)
- Cyptotrama nivea Singer (1989)
- Cyptotrama pauper Singer (1989)
- Cyptotrama platense Singer (1969)
- Cyptotrama songolara Courtec. (1995)
- Cyptotrama verruculosa (Singer) Singer (1973)
