= Claude Casimir Gillet =

French botanist

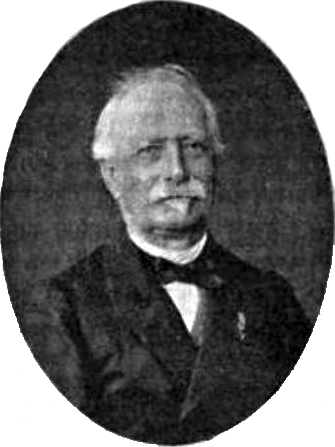
Claude Casimir Gillet (1806-1896)

Claude Casimir Gillet (19 May 1806 in Dormans, department of Marne – 1 September 1896 in Alençon), was a French botanist and mycologist. He initially trained as a medical doctor and veterinarian.

As a veterinarian, he worked for four years in Africa. Around 1853 he developed a passion for mycology, subsequently publishing a number of works on the subject. In 1867 he became a corresponding member of the Société Linnéenne de Normandie.

Gillet was the taxonomic authority of the genera Tubaria (initially named a subgenus of Agaricus by Worthington George Smith) and Microglossum.

He was honoured in 1899, when botanists P.A.Saccardo & P.Sydow published Gilletiella, which is a genus of fungi in the class Dothideomycetes.

== Publications ==
- Claude-Casimir Gillet, (1893) Agaricinées
- Claude-Casimir Gillet, (1879) Les discomycètes, 230 pp
- Gillet CG (1874) Les Hyménomycètes 828pp, (Full view available on google books)
- Claude-Casimir Gillet, Jean-Henri Magne, (1868) Nouvelle flore française 704pp, (Full view available on google books)

== See also ==
- Category:Taxa named by Claude Casimir Gillet
