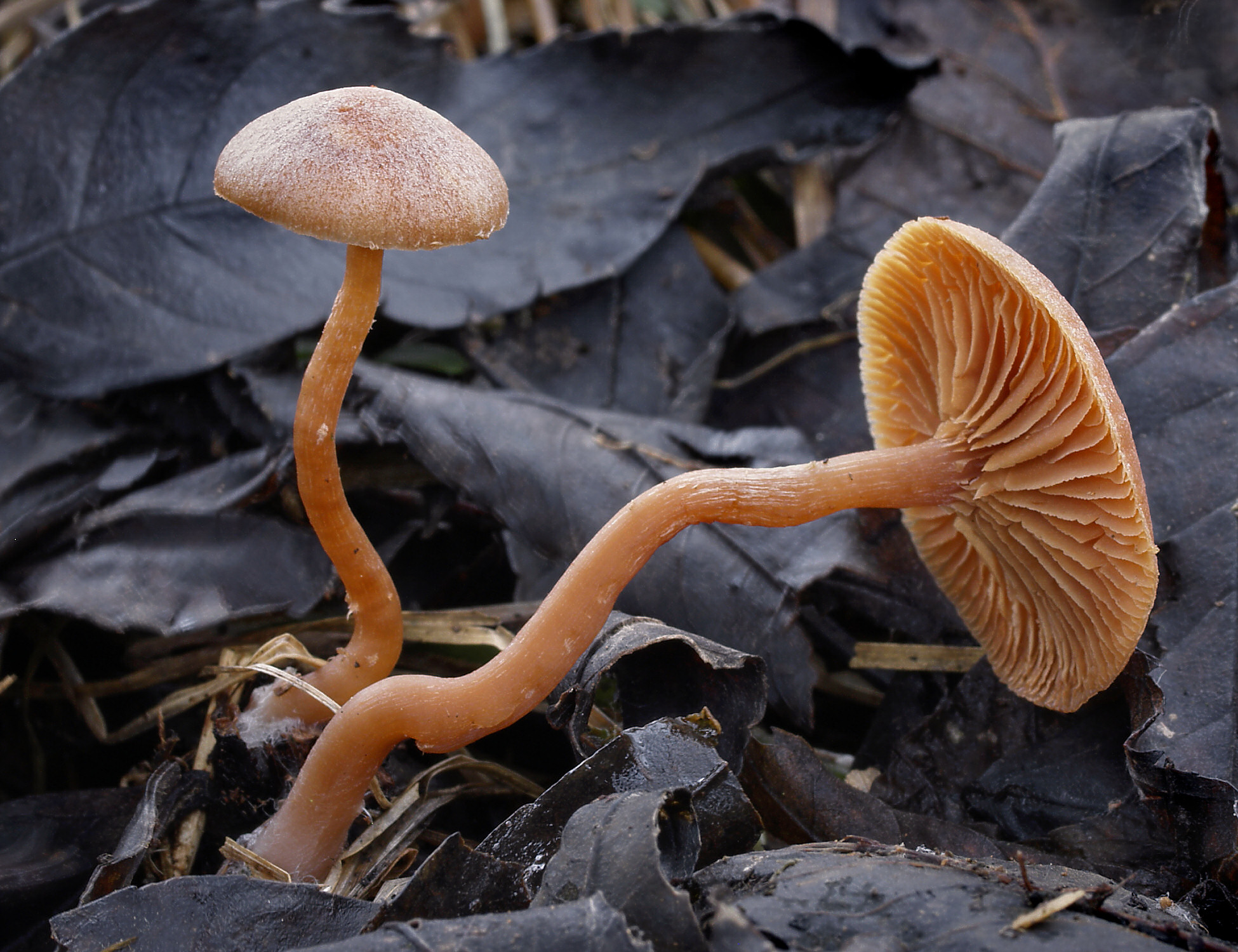
- Tubaria furfuracea

Scientific classification
- Kingdom: Fungi
- Division: Basidiomycota
- Class: Agaricomycetes
- Order: Agaricales
- Family: Tubariaceae; Vizzini (2008)

Type genus
- Tubaria (W.G.Sm.) Gillet (1876)

Genera
- Cyclocybe; Flammulaster; Phaeomarasmius; Phaeomyces; Tubaria

= Tubariaceae =

Family of fungi

The Tubariaceae is a family of basidiomycete fungi described by Alfredo Vizzini in 2008.

== Taxonomy ==
The genera Flammulaster, Phaeomarasmius, Phaeomyces and Tubaria, that previously belonged to the Inocybaceae, form the family Tubariaceae based on molecular evidence.
