= Russula fragrantissima =

Scientific classification
- Kingdom: Fungi
- Division: Basidiomycota
- Class: Agaricomycetes
- Order: Russulales
- Family: Russulaceae
- Genus: Russula
- Species: R. fragrantissima

Binomial name
- Russula fragrantissima Romagn

Species of fungus

Russula fragrantissima
- Mycological characteristics
- Gills on hymenium
- Cap is convex or depressed
- Hymenium is adnate or free
- Stipe is bare
- Spore print is cream to yellow
- Edibility is inedible or poisonous

Russula fragrantissima, commonly known as the almond-scented russula, fragrant russula, or fetid russula, is a species of mushroom in the family Russulaceae. It is inedible and may be poisonous.

== Description ==
The cap of Russula fragrantissima is brown in color and about 5-15 centimeters in diameter. It is slimy when wet, and can be convex, flat, or depressed. The gills are cream-colored and become yellowish or light ochre as the mushroom gets older. They can be free, adnate, or adnexed. The stipe is white, sometimes with brownish stains near the base. It is about 7-15 centimeters long and 1.5-6 centimeters wide. The spore print can be pale yellow or cream-colored. At first, this mushroom is said to smell like almonds or maraschino cherries, but the smell becomes unpleasant as the mushroom gets older. The taste is unpleasant or bitter to acrid.

== Habitat and ecology ==
Russula fragrantissima is a mycorrhizal fungus. It is found under both hardwoods and conifers.
