= Coprinellus pyrrhanthes =

Scientific classification
- Domain: Eukaryota
- Kingdom: Fungi
- Division: Basidiomycota
- Class: Agaricomycetes
- Order: Agaricales
- Family: Psathyrellaceae
- Genus: Coprinellus
- Species: C. pyrrhanthes

Binomial name
- Coprinellus pyrrhanthes (Romagn.) Redhead, Vilgalys & Moncalvo

Species of fungus

Coprinellus pyrrhanthes is a species of mushroom in the family Psathyrellaceae. First described as Coprinus pyrrhanthes by the mycologist Henri Romagnesi in 1951, it was later transferred to the genus Coprinellus in 2001.
