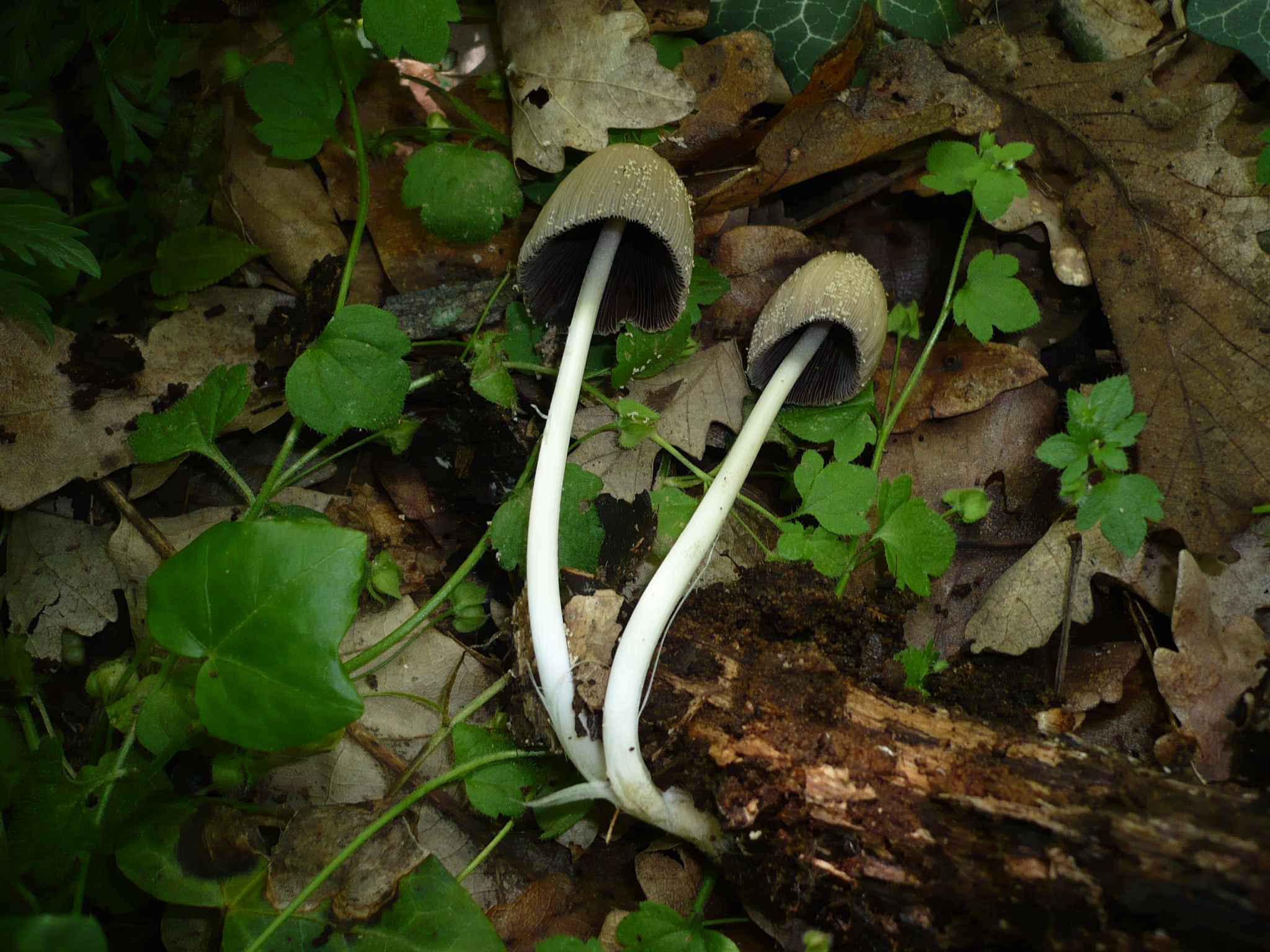

Scientific classification
- Domain: Eukaryota
- Kingdom: Fungi
- Division: Basidiomycota
- Class: Agaricomycetes
- Order: Agaricales
- Family: Psathyrellaceae
- Genus: Coprinellus
- Species: C. xanthothrix

Binomial name
- Coprinellus xanthothrix (Romagn.) Vilgalys, Hopple & Jacq.Johnson

= Coprinellus xanthothrix =

Species of fungus

Coprinellus xanthothrix is a species of fungus in the family Psathyrellaceae. This species was isolated from a polyphenol-polluted site near an olive processing plant in Greece. Shown to have the enzymes laccase and manganese peroxidase, the fungus is able to decolorize the recalcitrant polymeric dye R-478. First described as Coprinus xanthothrix by the French mycologist Henri Romagnesi in 1941, it was later transferred to the genus Coprinellus in 2001.
