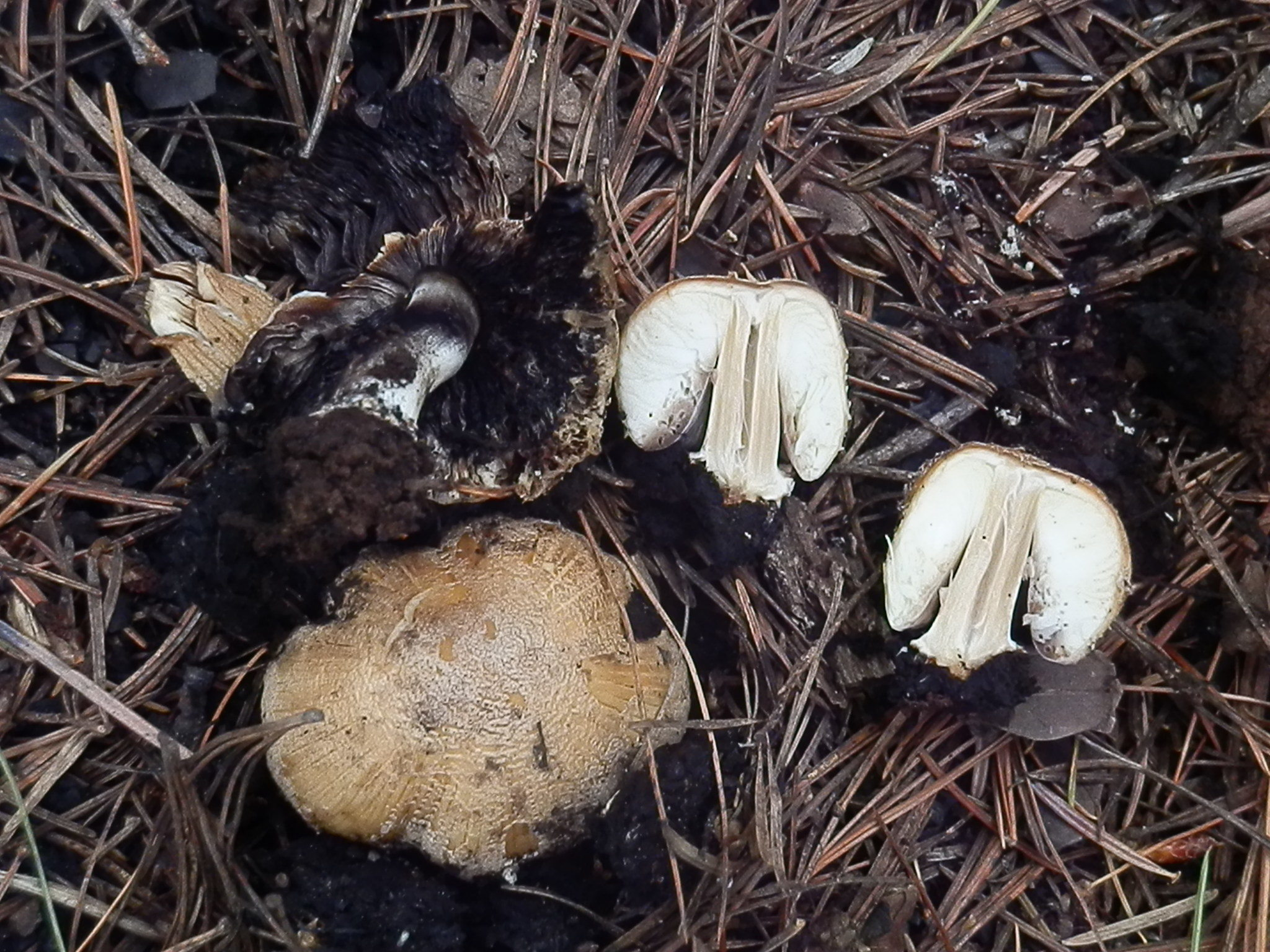

Scientific classification
- Kingdom: Fungi
- Division: Basidiomycota
- Class: Agaricomycetes
- Order: Agaricales
- Family: Psathyrellaceae
- Genus: Coprinellus
- Species: C. bipellis

Binomial name
- Coprinellus bipellis (Romagn.) P. Roux, Guy Garcia & Borgarin

= Coprinellus bipellis =

Species of fungus

Coprinellus bipellis is a species of mushroom in the family Psathyrellaceae. It was first described as Coprinus bipellis by Henri Romagnesi in 1976, and later transferred to the genus Coprinellus in 2006.
