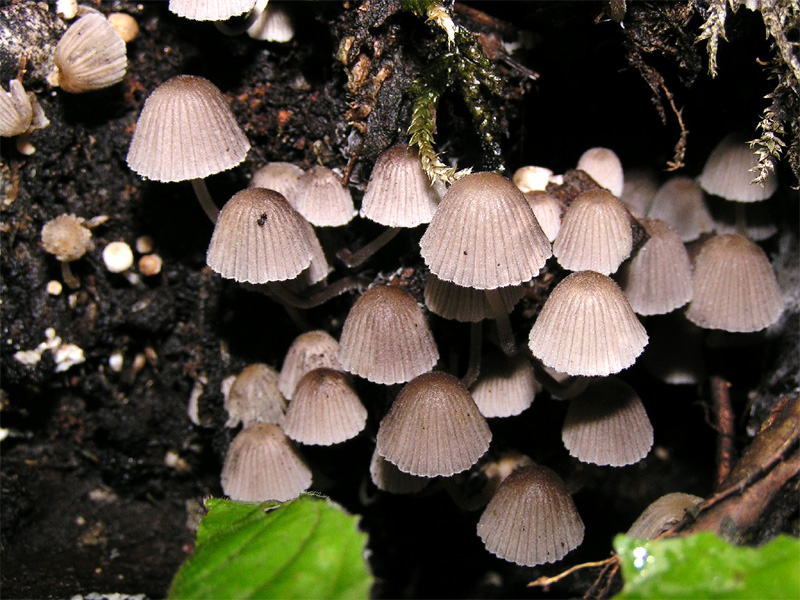
- Coprinellus disseminatus

Scientific classification
- Kingdom: Fungi
- Division: Basidiomycota
- Class: Agaricomycetes
- Order: Agaricales
- Family: Psathyrellaceae
- Genus: Coprinellus; P.Karst. (1879)

Type species
- Coprinellus deliquescens (Bull.) P.Karst. (1879)

= Coprinellus =

Genus of fungi

Coprinellus is a genus of mushroom-forming fungi in the family Psathyrellaceae. The genus was circumscribed by the Finnish mycologist Petter Adolf Karsten in 1879. Most Coprinellus species were transferred from the once large genus Coprinus. Molecular studies published in 2001 redistributed Coprinus species to Psathyrella, or the segregate genera Coprinopsis and Coprinellus.

In 2020, phylogenetic analysis conducted by the German mycologists Dieter Wächter & Andreas Melzer reclassified many Coprinellus species as belonging to the new genus Tulosesus.

== Species ==
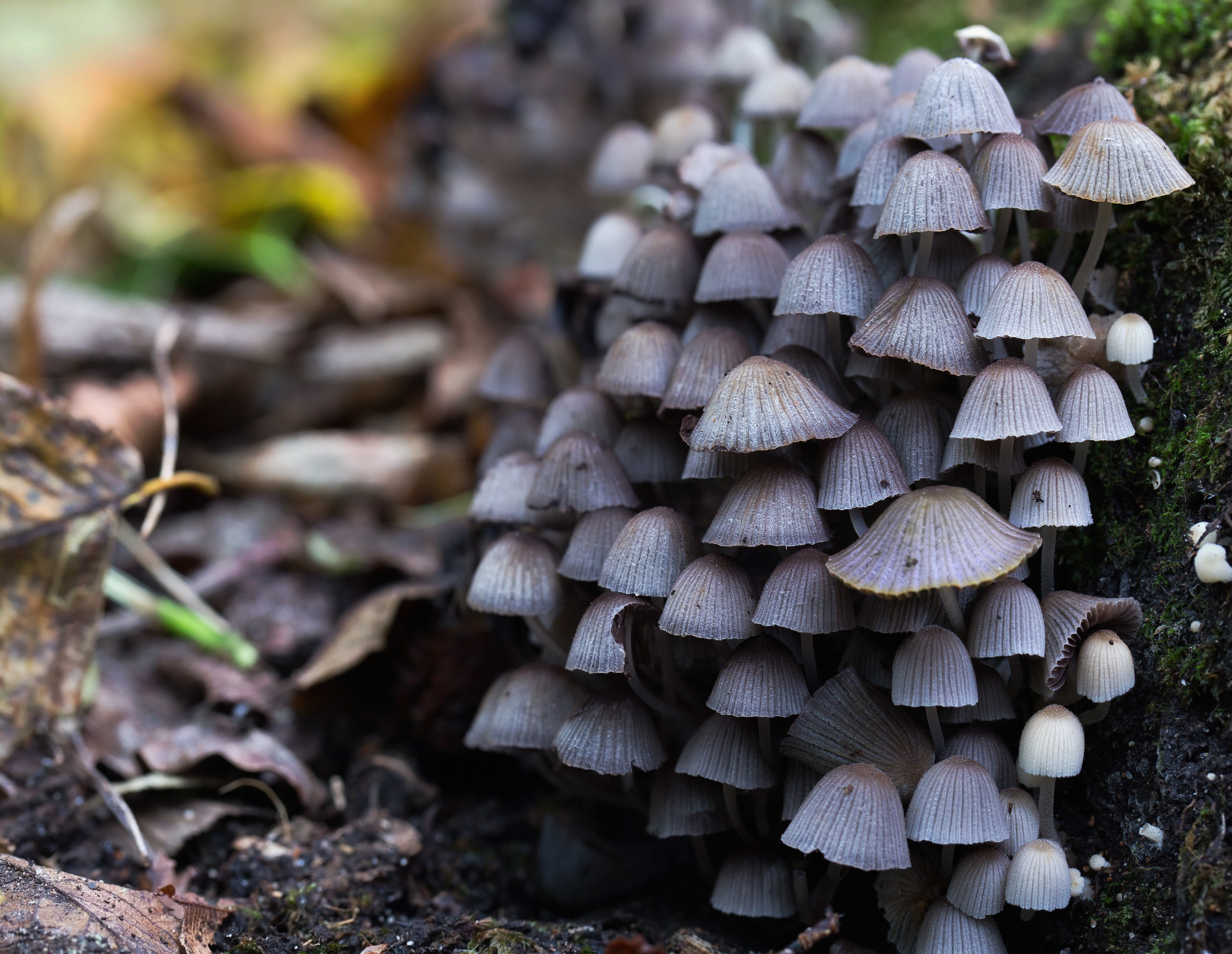
Coprinellus disseminatus

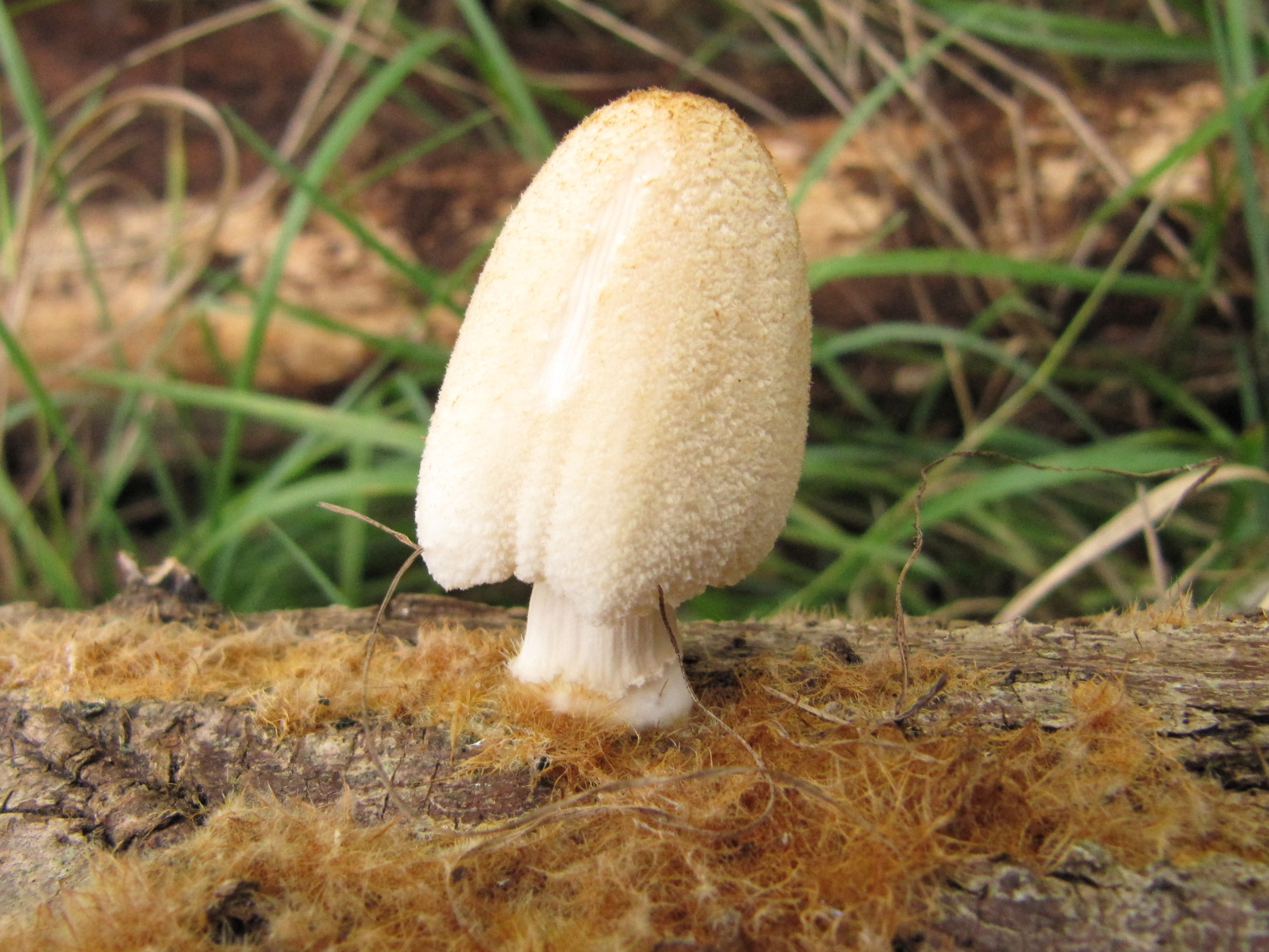
Coprinellus ellisii

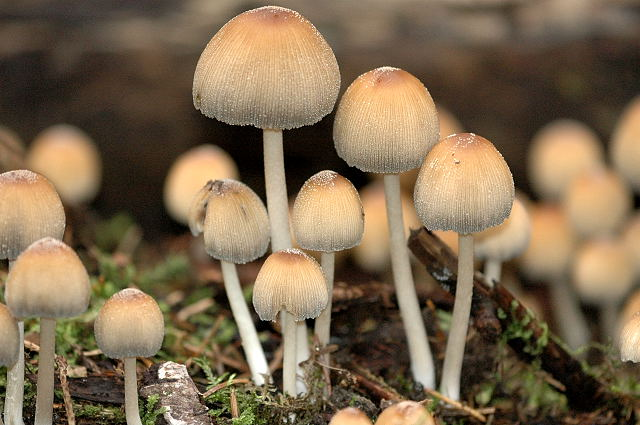
Coprinellus micaceus

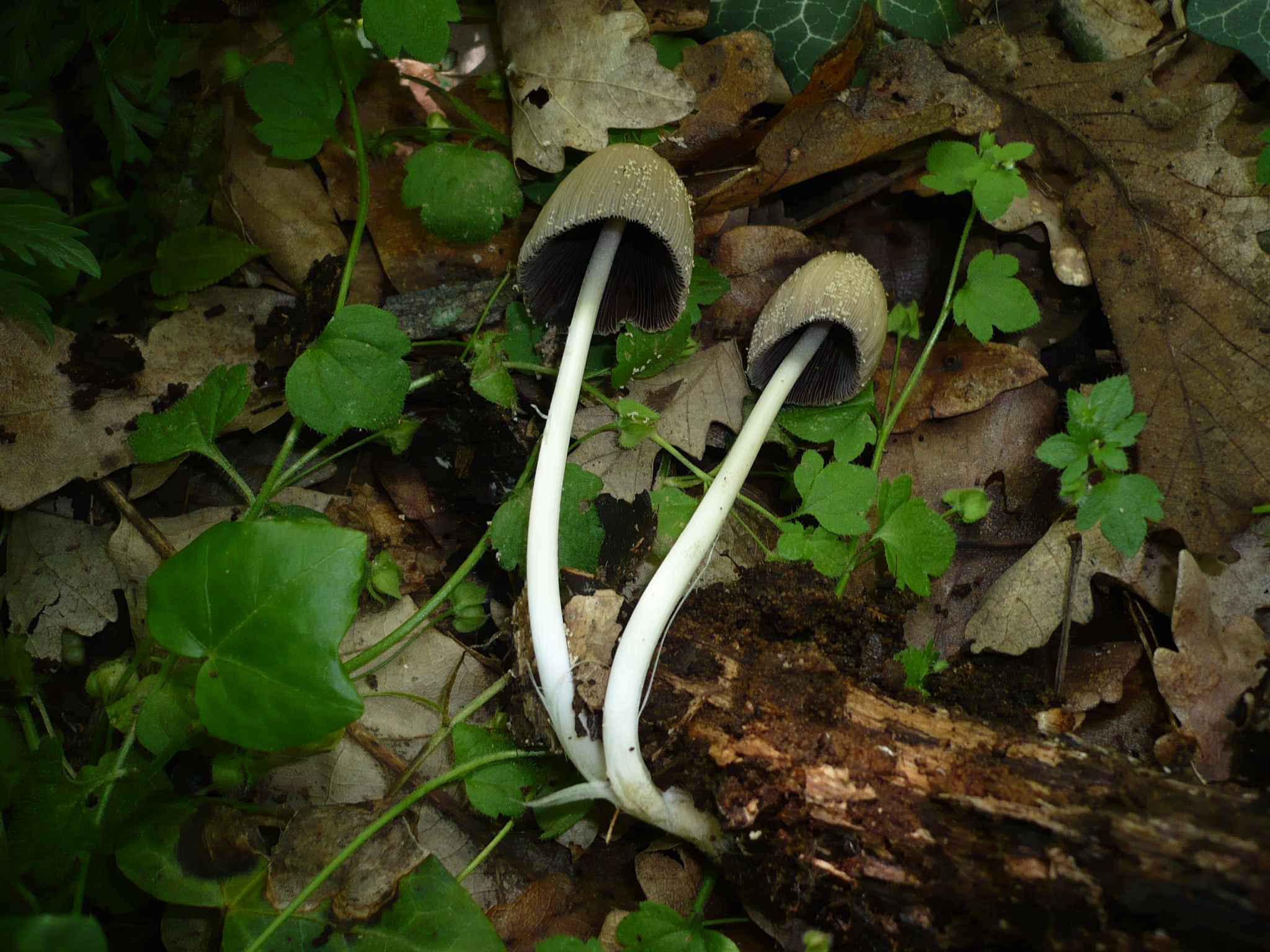
Coprinellus xanthothrix

As of July 2022, Index Fungorum accepted 62 species of Coprinellus. In recent years many species were added to the genus having mostly been moved from Coprinus whilst numerous species were removed and placed in the genus Tulosesus in 2020. One species was moved to the monotypic genus Punjabia. The total number of accepted species has not changed greatly from the 66 in 2019, however many species have been moved. Due to the significant changes to this genus recently many old synonyms are likely to still be in use. As of February 2026, there were 73 accepted species of Coprinellus in Index Fungorum.

Many of these species appear similar and require microscopic analysis to differentiate and identify.

1. Coprinellus alkalinus (Anastasiou) Voto (2021)
2. Coprinellus alvesii P. Voto (2019)
3. Coprinellus andreorum Sammut & Karich 2021
4. Coprinellus apleurocystidiosus Voto (2021)
5. Coprinellus aquatilis (Peck) Voto (2019)
6. Coprinellus arenicola Wartchow & A.R.P. Gomes (2014)
7. Coprinellus aureodisseminatus T. Bau & L.Y. Zhu 2024
8. Coprinellus aureogranulatus (Uljé & Aptroot) Redhead, Vilgalys & Moncalvo (2001)
9. Coprinellus austrodisseminatus T. Bau & L.Y. Zhu 2024
10. Coprinellus bipellis (Romagn.) P. Roux, Guy García & Borgarino (2006)
11. Coprinellus bulleri (Cacialli, Caroti & Doveri) Gminder (2010)
12. Coprinellus campanulatus S. Hussain & H. Ahmad (2018)
13. Coprinellus carbonicola (Singer) Voto (2020)
14. Coprinellus castaneus (Berk. & Broome) Voto 2020
15. Coprinellus chaignonii (Pat.) Voto (2019)
16. Coprinellus crassitunicatus Voto (2021)
17. Coprinellus criniticaulis Voto (2021)
18. Coprinellus curtoides Voto (2021)
19. Coprinellus curtus (Kalchbr.) Vilgalys, Hopple & Jacq. Johnson (2001)
20. Coprinellus deliquescens (Bull.) P. Karst. (1879)
21. Coprinellus deminutus (Enderle) Valade (2014)
22. Coprinellus dendrocystotus (Voto) Voto 2023
23. Coprinellus dilectissimus Voto & Maraia 2025
24. Coprinellus dilectus (Fr.) Redhead, Vilgalys & Moncalvo (2001)
25. Coprinellus disseminatisimilis S. Hussain (2018)
26. Coprinellus disseminatus (Pers.) J.E. Lange (1938)
27. Coprinellus domesticus (Bolton) Vilgalys, Hopple & Jacq. Johnson (2001)
28. Coprinellus duricystidiosus Voto (2021)
29. Coprinellus ellisii (P.D. Orton) Redhead, Vilgalys & Moncalvo (2001)
30. Coprinellus ephemerus (Bull.) Redhead, Vilgalys & Moncalvo 2001
31. Coprinellus fimbriatus (Berk. & Broome) Redhead, Vilgalys & Moncalvo (2001)
32. Coprinellus flocculosus (DC.) Vilgalys, Hopple & Jacq. Johnson (2001)
33. Coprinellus furfurellus (Berk. & Broome) Redhead, Vilgalys & Moncalvo (2001)
34. Coprinellus heptemerus (M. Lange & A.H. Sm.) Vilgalys, Hopple & Jacq. Johnson (2001)
35. Coprinellus hylaeae (Singer) Voto (2022)
36. Coprinellus limicola (Uljé) Doveri & Sarrocco (2011)
37. Coprinellus magnoliae N.I. de Silva, Lumyong & K.D. Hyde (2021)
38. Coprinellus maluri-cyanei Y.P. Tan & Bishop-Hurley 2024
39. Coprinellus maysoidisporus Voto (2021)
40. Coprinellus micaceus (Bull.) Vilgalys, Hopple & Jacq. Johnson (2001)
41. Coprinellus neodilectus Voto (2019)
42. Coprinellus occultivolvatus Voto (2021)
43. Coprinellus ovatus M. Kamran & S. Jabeen (2020)
44. Coprinellus pakistanicus Usman & Khalid 2018
45. Coprinellus pallidissimus (Romagn.) P. Roux, Guy García & S. Roux (2006)
46. Coprinellus papillatus Voto (2021)
47. Coprinellus parapellucidus Voto (2021)
48. Coprinellus parcus T. Bau, L.Y. Zhu & M. Huang 2024
49. Coprinellus parvulus (P.-J. Keizer & Uljé) Házi, L. Nagy, Papp & Vágvölgyi (2011)
50. Coprinellus phaeoxanthus A.R.P. Gomes & Wartchow (2016)
51. Coprinellus plicatiloides (Buller) Voto (2020)
52. Coprinellus pseudomicaceus (Dennis) Voto (2019)
53. Coprinellus punjabensis Usman & Khalid (2021)
54. Coprinellus pusillulus (Svrček) Házi, L. Nagy, Papp & Vágvölgyi (2011)
55. Coprinellus pyrrhanthes (Romagn.) Redhead, Vilgalys & Moncalvo (2001)
56. Coprinellus radians (Desm.) Vilgalys, Hopple & Jacq. Johnson (2001)
57. Coprinellus rufopruinatus (Romagn.) N. Schwab (2019)
58. Coprinellus saccharinus (Romagn.) P. Roux, Guy García & Dumas (2006)
59. Coprinellus sclerobasidium (Singer) Voto (2020)
60. Coprinellus silvaticus (Peck) Gminder (2010)
61. Coprinellus subangularis (Thiers) Voto (2020)
62. Coprinellus subcurtus P. Voto (2019)
63. Coprinellus subradians Voto (2021)
64. Coprinellus subrenispermus (Singer) Voto (2020)
65. Coprinellus tenuis S. Hussain (2018)
66. Coprinellus tibiiformis Voto (2021)
67. Coprinellus truncorum (Scop.) Redhead, Vilgalys & Moncalvo (2001)
68. Coprinellus valdivianus (Singer) Voto, Dibán & Maraia 2023
69. Coprinellus velutipes T. Bau & L.Y. Zhu 2024
70. Coprinellus venustus (McKnight & P. Allison) Voto (2020)
71. Coprinellus verrucispermus (Joss. & Enderle) Redhead, Vilgalys & Moncalvo (2001)
72. Coprinellus xanthothrix (Romagn.) Vilgalys, Hopple & Jacq. Johnson (2001)
73. Coprinellus xylophilus Voto (2021)

== Former Species ==
These species were reclassified as Tulosesus in 2020.

1. Coprinellus allovelus (Uljé) Doveri & Sarrocco 2011
2. Coprinellus amphithallus (M.Lange & A.H.Sm.) Redhead, Vilgalys & Moncalvo 2001
3. Coprinellus angulatus (Peck) Redhead, Vilgalys & Moncalvo 2001
4. Coprinellus aokii (Hongo) Vilgalys, Hopple & Jacq.Johnson 2001
5. Coprinellus bisporiger (Buller ex P.D.Orton) Redhead, Vilgalys & Moncalvo 2001
6. Coprinellus bisporus (J.E.Lange) Vilgalys, Hopple & Jacq. Johnson 2001
7. Coprinellus brevisetulosus (Arnolds) Redhead, Vilgalys & Moncalvo 2001
8. Coprinellus callinus (M.Lange & A.H.Sm.) Vilgalys, Hopple & Jacq.Johnson 2001
9. Coprinellus canistri (Uljé & Verbeken) Doveri & Sarrocco 2011
10. Coprinellus christianopolitanus Örstadius & E.Larss. (2015)
11. Coprinellus cinereopallidus L.Nagy, Házi, T.Papp & Vágvölgyi 2012
12. Coprinellus cinnamomeotinctus (P.D.Orton) D.J.Schaf. 2012
13. Coprinellus congregatus (Bull.) P.Karst. 1879
14. Coprinellus doverii (L.Nagy) Házi, L.Nagy, T.Papp & Vágvölgyi 2011
15. Coprinellus ephemerus (Bull.) Redhead, Vilgalys & Moncalvo 2001
16. Coprinellus eurysporus (M.Lange & A.H.Sm.) Redhead, Vilgalys & Moncalvo 2001
17. Coprinellus fallax (M.Lange & A.H.Sm.) Redhead, Vilgalys & Moncalvo 2001
18. Coprinellus fuscocystidiatus L.Nagy, Házi, T.Papp & Vágvölgyi 2012
19. Coprinellus heterosetulosus (Locq. ex Watling) Vilgalys, Hopple & Jacq.Johnson 2001
20. Coprinellus heterothrix (Kühner) Redhead, Vilgalys & Moncalvo 2001
21. Coprinellus hiascens (Fr.) Redhead, Vilgalys & Moncalvo 2001
22. Coprinellus impatiens (Fr.) J.E.Lange 1938
23. Coprinellus marculentus (Britzelm.) Redhead, Vilgalys & Moncalvo 2001
24. Coprinellus minutisporus (Uljé) Doveri & Sarrocco 2011
25. Coprinellus mitrinodulisporus Doveri & Saccoro 2011
26. Coprinellus pallidus L.Nagy, Házi, T.Papp & Vágvölgyi 2012
27. Coprinellus pellucidus (P.Karst.) Redhead, Vilgalys & Moncalvo 2001
28. Coprinellus plagioporus (Romagn.) Redhead, Vilgalys & Moncalvo 2001
29. Coprinellus pseudoamphithallus (Uljé) Doveri & Sarrocco 2011
30. Coprinellus radicellus Házi, L.Nagy, T.Papp & Vágvölgyi 2011
31. Coprinellus sabulicola L.Nagy, Házi, T.Papp & Vágvölgyi 2012
32. Coprinellus sassii (M.Lange & A.H.Sm.) Redhead, Vilgalys & Moncalvo 2001
33. Coprinellus sclerocystidiosus (M.Lange & A.H.Sm.) Vilgalys, Hopple & Jacq.Johnson 2001
34. Coprinellus singularis (Uljé) Redhead, Vilgalys & Moncalvo 2001
35. Coprinellus subdisseminatus (M.Lange) Redhead, Vilgalys & Moncalvo 2001
36. Coprinellus subimpatiens (M.Lange & A.H.Sm.) Redhead, Vilgalys & Moncalvo 2001
37. Coprinellus subpurpureus (A.H.Sm.) Redhead, Vilgalys & Moncalvo 2001
38. Coprinellus uljei L.Nagy, Házi, T.Papp & Vágvölgyi 2012
39. Coprinellus velatopruinatus (Bender) Redhead, Vilgalys & Moncalvo 2001

== See also ==
- Tulosesus
- Punjabia
