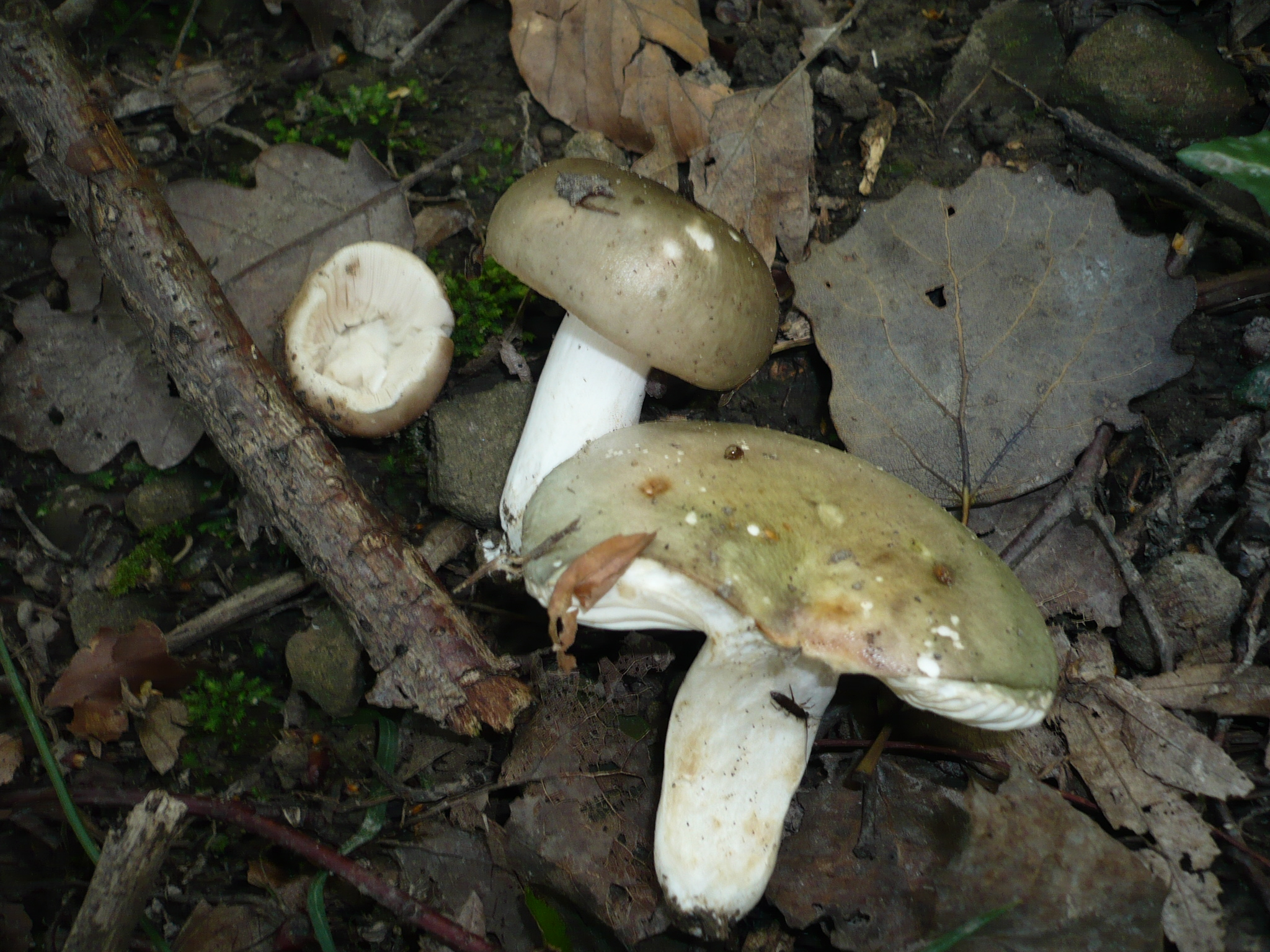

Scientific classification
- Domain: Eukaryota
- Kingdom: Fungi
- Division: Basidiomycota
- Class: Agaricomycetes
- Order: Russulales
- Family: Russulaceae
- Genus: Russula
- Species: R. medullata

Binomial name
- Russula medullata Romagnesi (1997)

= Russula medullata =

Species of fungus

Russula medullata is a species of mushroom in the genus Russula. It was officially described by French mycologist Henri Romagnesi in 1997.

== See also ==
- List of Russula species
