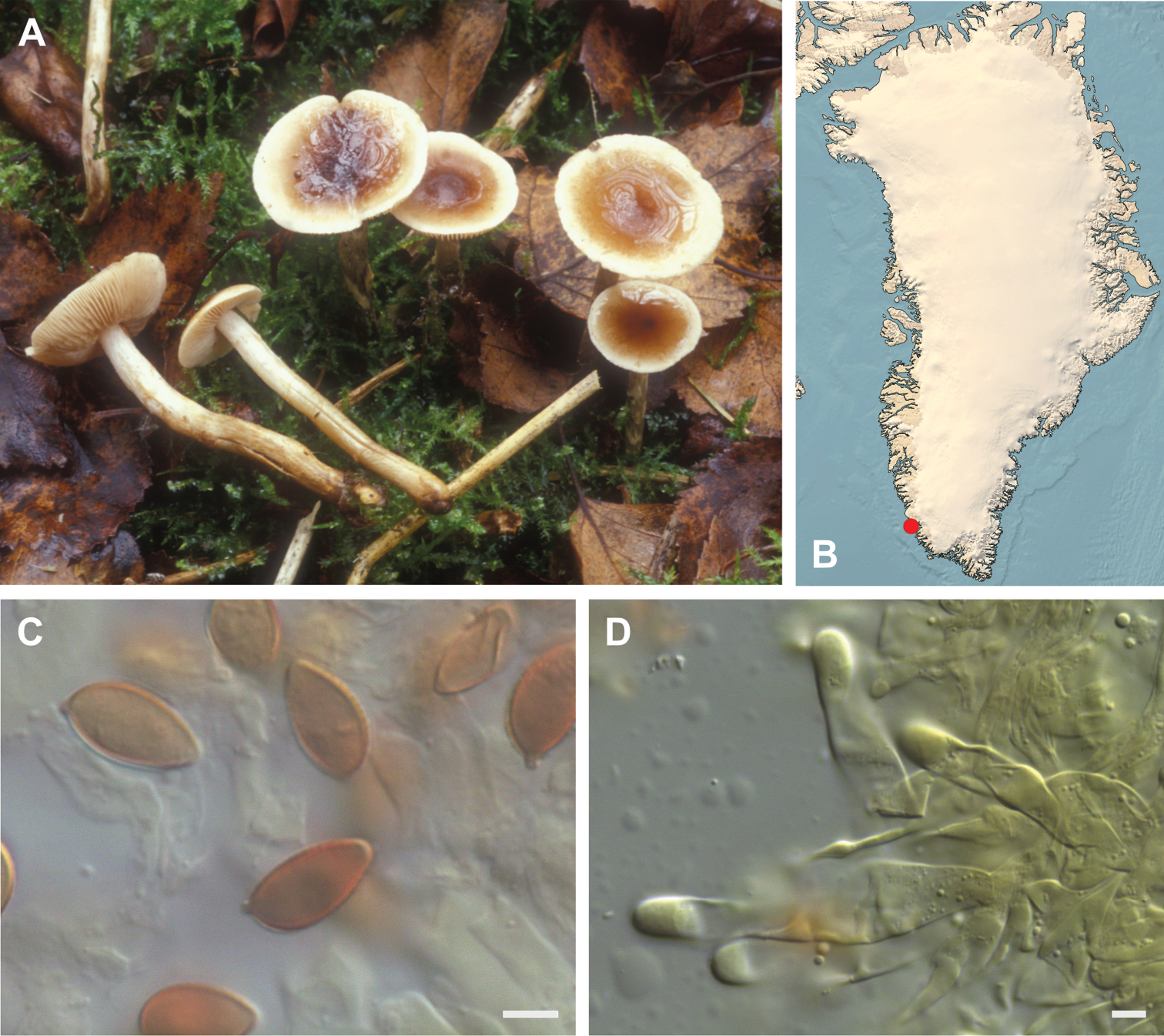
- H. clavulipes A JV02-517 (from Denmark) B distribution of cited collections C spores ×1600 and D cheilocystidia ×1000 of TB90.100 in Melzer's reagent. Scale bars: 5 µm

Scientific classification
- Domain: Eukaryota
- Kingdom: Fungi
- Division: Basidiomycota
- Class: Agaricomycetes
- Order: Agaricales
- Family: Hymenogastraceae
- Genus: Hebeloma
- Species: H. clavulipes

Binomial name
- Hebeloma clavulipes Romagn. (1965)

= Hebeloma clavulipes =

Species of fungus

Hebeloma clavulipes is a species of mushroom in the family Hymenogastraceae. It was described as new to science in 1965 by French mycologist Henri Romagnesi.

== See also ==
- List of Hebeloma species
