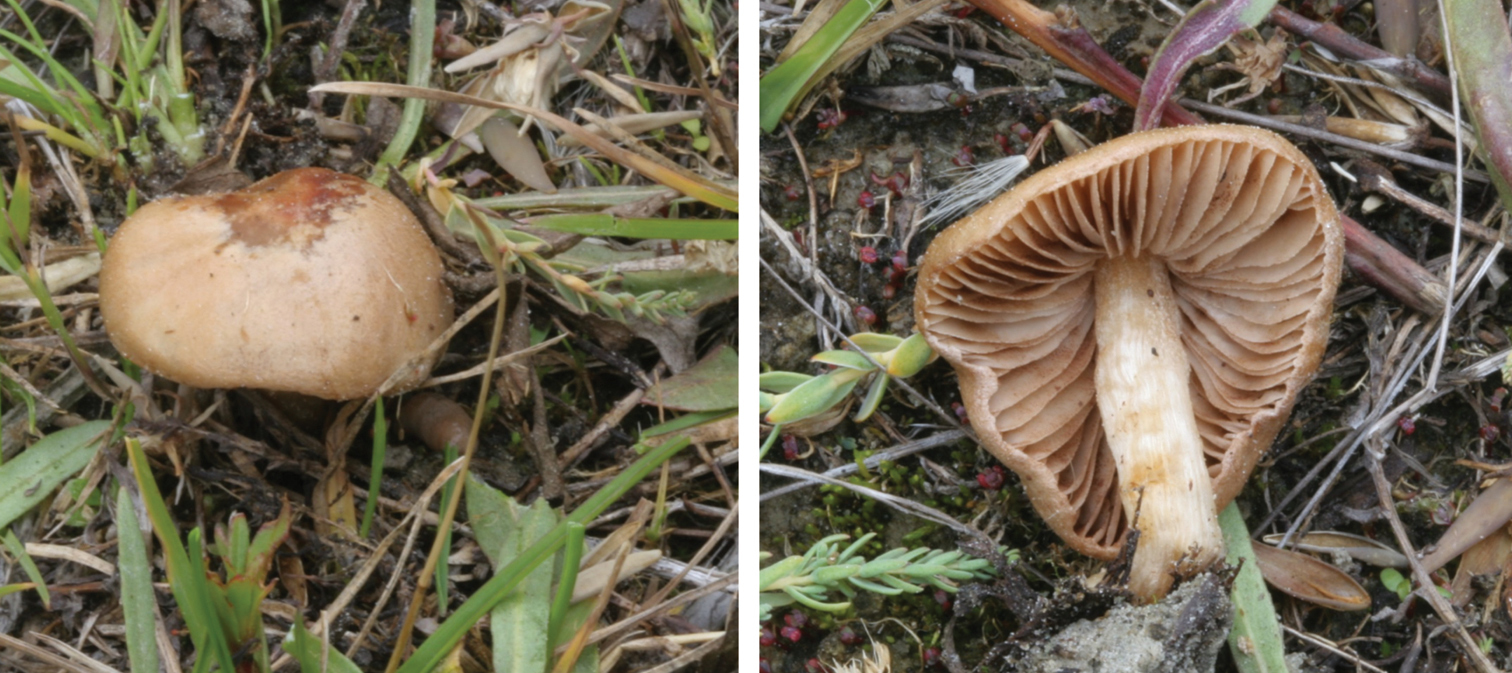

Scientific classification
- Domain: Eukaryota
- Kingdom: Fungi
- Division: Basidiomycota
- Class: Agaricomycetes
- Order: Agaricales
- Family: Hymenogastraceae
- Genus: Hebeloma
- Species: H. vaccinum

Binomial name
- Hebeloma vaccinum Romagn. (1965)

Synonyms
- Hebelomatis vaccinum (Romagn.) Locq. (1979); Hebeloma vaccinum var. cephalotum Enderle & Vesterh. (2004)

= Hebeloma vaccinum =

Species of fungus

Hebeloma vaccinum is a species of agaric fungus in the family Hymenogastraceae. It was described as new to science in 1965 by French mycologist Henri Romagnesi.

== See also ==
- List of Hebeloma species
