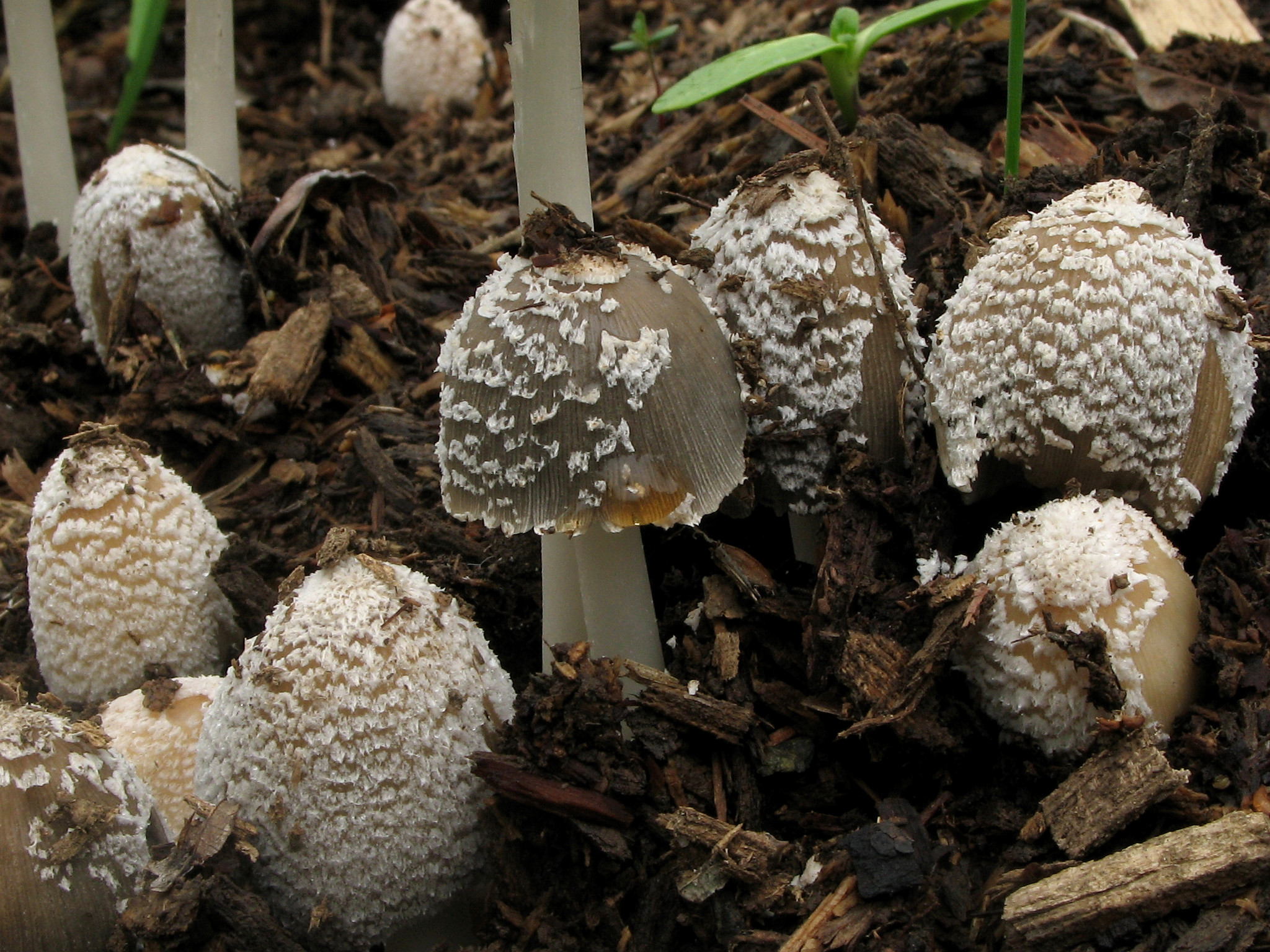

Scientific classification
- Kingdom: Fungi
- Division: Basidiomycota
- Class: Agaricomycetes
- Order: Agaricales
- Family: Psathyrellaceae
- Genus: Coprinellus
- Species: C. flocculosus

Binomial name
- Coprinellus flocculosus (DC.) Vilgalys, Hopple & Jacq.Johnson (2001)

Synonyms
- Agaricus flocculosus DC. (1805); Coprinus flocculosus (DC.) Fr. (1838)

= Coprinellus flocculosus =

Species of fungus

Coprinellus flocculosus is a species of agaric fungus in the family Psathyrellaceae.

== Taxonomy ==
It was first described as Agaricus flocculosus by mycologist Augustin Pyramus de Candolle in 1815, and later transferred to the genus Coprinellus in 2001.

== Description ==
The yellowish cap is initially egg-shaped then forms a cone up to 5 centimetres (2 in) tall, with white specks, for which it is named. The gills are adnexed and close. The stem is up to 9 cm (3 1/2 in) long and 7 millimetres (1/4 in) thick. The spore print is black, and the gills deliquesce.

It resembles a number of related species.

== Habitat and distribution ==
It can be found in wood debris throughout North America.

Coprinellus flocculosus
- Mycological characteristics
- Gills on hymenium
- Cap is ovate or campanulate
- Hymenium is adnexed or free
- Stipe has a volva or is bare
- Spore print is black
- Ecology is saprotrophic
- Edibility is unknown
