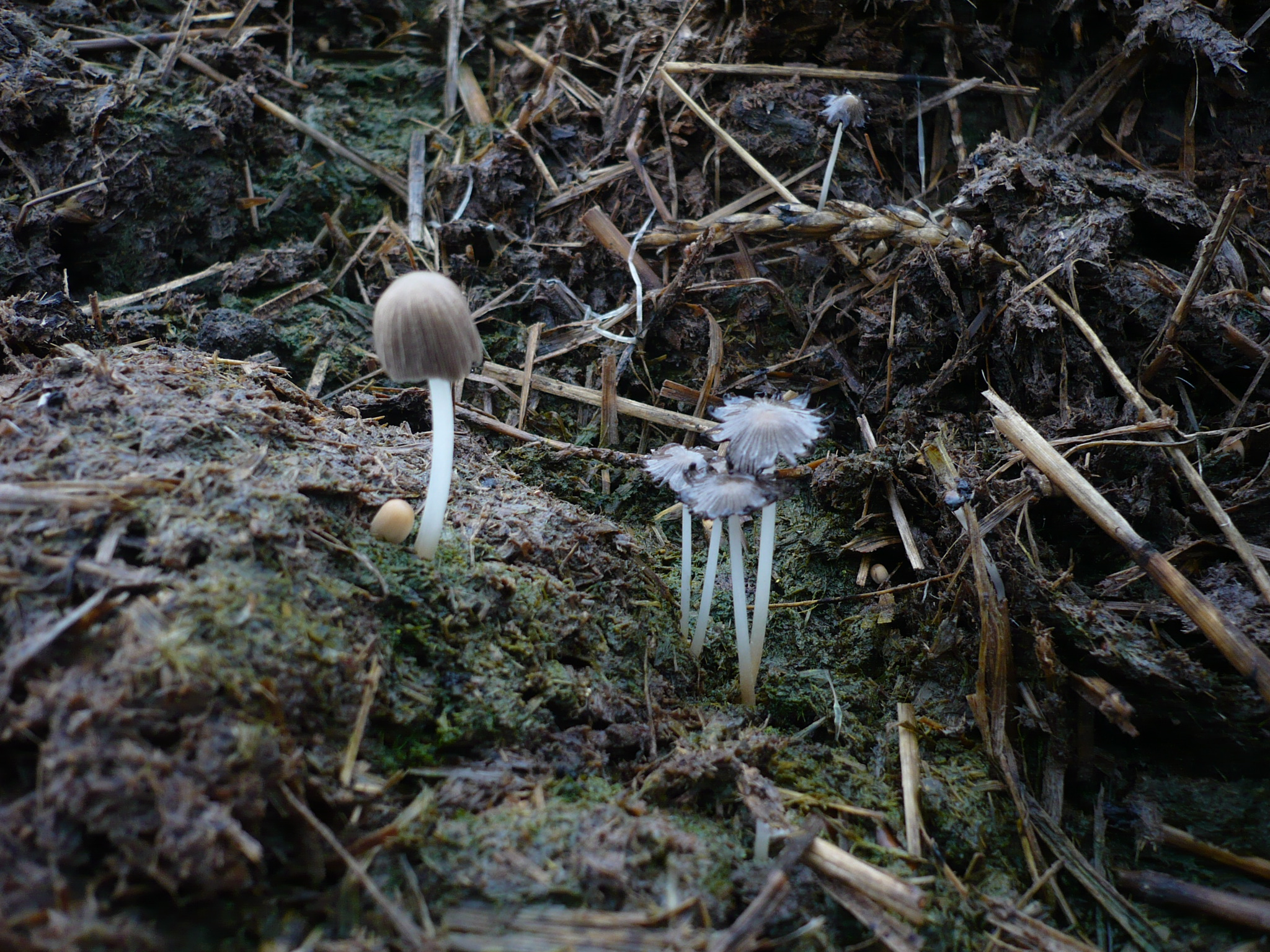

Scientific classification
- Domain: Eukaryota
- Kingdom: Fungi
- Division: Basidiomycota
- Class: Agaricomycetes
- Order: Agaricales
- Family: Psathyrellaceae
- Genus: Tulosesus
- Species: T. ephemerus

Binomial name
- Tulosesus ephemerus (Bull.) D. Wächt & A. Melzer (2020)

Synonyms
- Agaricus ephemerus Bull. (1786); Coprinus ephemerus Fr. (1838); Ephemerocybe ephemerus Fayod (1889); Ephemerocybe ephemera Fayod (1893); Coprinellus ephemerus Redhead, Vilgalys & Moncalvo (2001); Agaricus momentaneus Bull. (1783); Agaricus ephemerus var. momentaneus DC. (1805); Coprinus momentaneus Sacc (1916); Agaricus momentaceus Bull. (1792); Coprinus ephemerus f. saturatus J.E.Lange (1939); Coprinus ephemerus var. radicans Wichanský (1968)

= Tulosesus ephemerus =

Species of fungus

Tulosesus ephemerus is a species of mushroom producing fungus in the family Psathyrellaceae.

== Taxonomy ==
It was first described as Agaricus ephemerus by French mycologist Jean Baptiste François Pierre Bulliard in 1786.

In 2001 a phylogenetic study resulted in a major reorganization and reshuffling of that genus and this species was transferred to Coprinellus.

The species was known as Coprinellus ephemerus until 2020 when the German mycologists Dieter Wächter and Andreas Melzer reclassified many species in the Psathyrellaceae family based on phylogenetic analysis.
