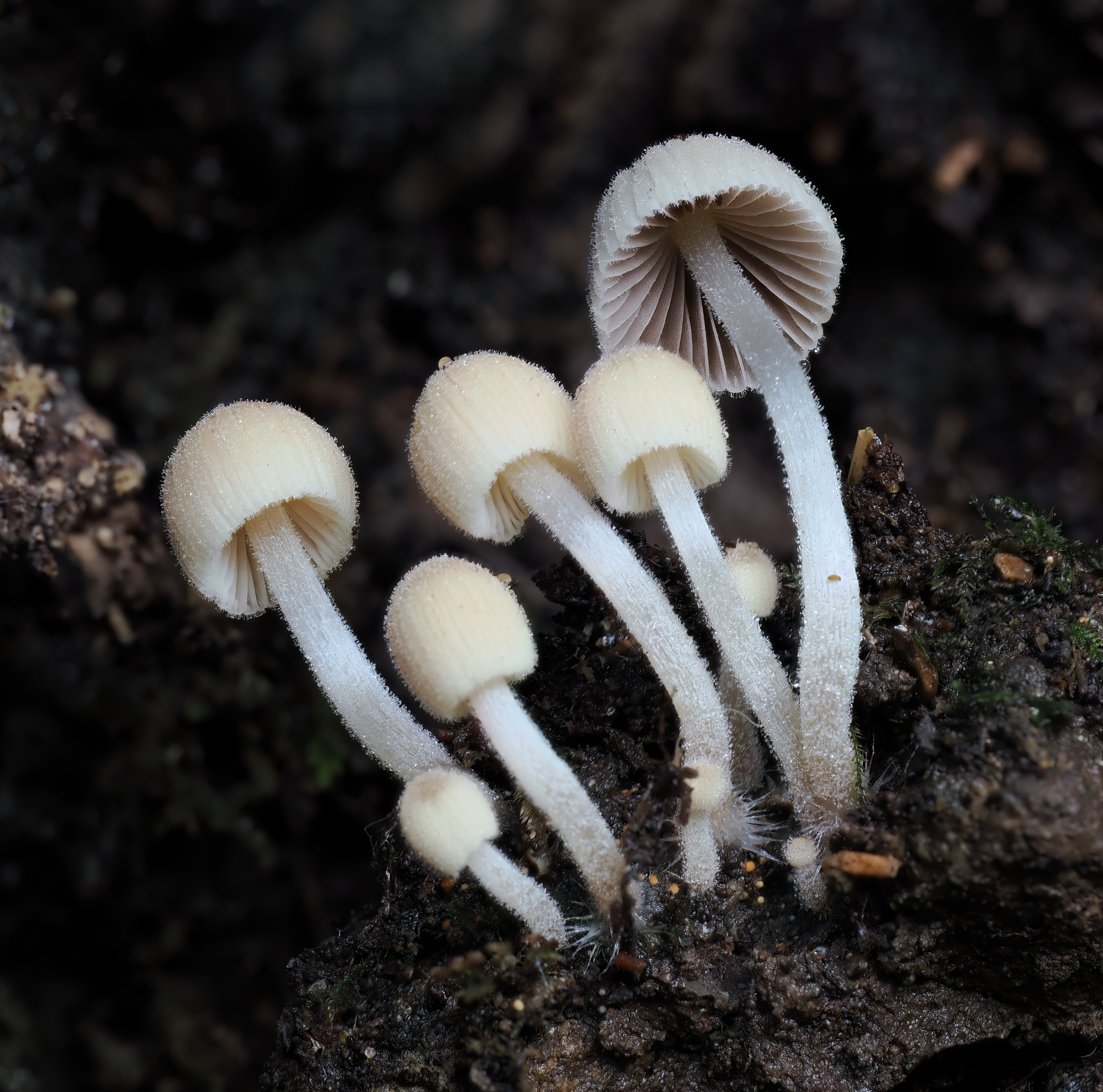

Scientific classification
- Kingdom: Fungi
- Division: Basidiomycota
- Class: Agaricomycetes
- Order: Agaricales
- Family: Psathyrellaceae
- Genus: Coprinellus
- Species: C. disseminatus

Binomial name
- Coprinellus disseminatus (Pers.) J.E.Lange (1938)

Synonyms
- Agaricus disseminatus Pers. (1801); Pseudocoprinus disseminatus (Pers.) Kühner (1928); Coprinus disseminatus (Pers.) Gray (1821)

= Coprinellus disseminatus =

Species of fungus

Coprinellus disseminatus
- Mycological characteristics
- Gills on hymenium
- Cap is convex
- Hymenium is adnate
- Stipe is bare
- Spore print is black
- Ecology is saprotrophic
- Edibility is edible

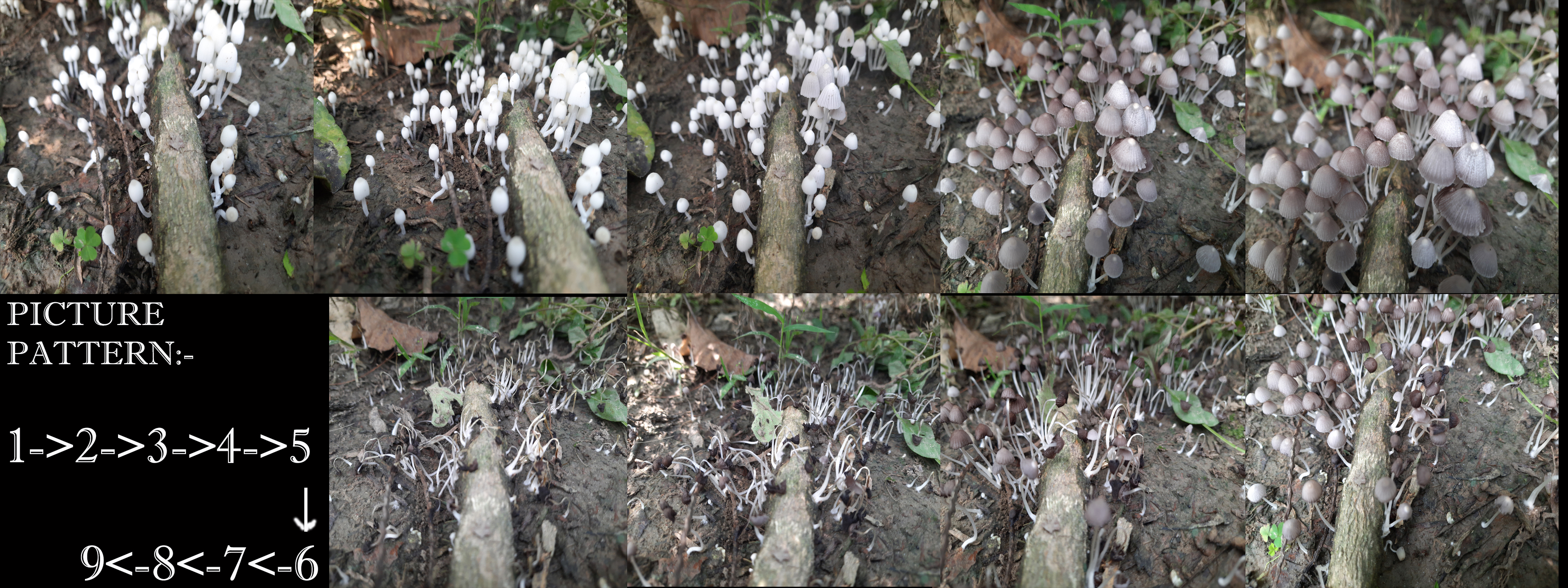
Life cycle Of Coprinellus disseminatus (zoom in)

Coprinellus disseminatus, commonly known as the fairy inkcap, fairy bonnet, or trooping crumble cap, is a species of agaric fungus in the family Psathyrellaceae. It can be found around dead wood in Europe and North America.

== Taxonomy ==
The species was given its current name in 1939 by Jakob Emanuel Lange.

== Description ==
Coprinellus disseminatus grows to 4 centimetres (1 5/8 in) tall. The bell-shaped cap is tannish, becoming gray with age. The spore print is blackish-brown.

The species has about 143 sexes (mating types).

=== Similar species ===
It is difficult to distinguish from related species or lookalikes in Tulosesus.

C. disseminatus does not dissolve into black ink (deliquesce) in maturity, unlike most other coprinoid mushrooms.

== Distribution and habitat ==
The species grows on dead wood such as rotting stumps and is widespread across Europe. It can be found in North America from May to November in the East and October to March near the West Coast.

== Uses ==
The species is nonpoisonous. It can be eaten raw or cooked but does not preserve well. It is considered too small to be of economic value.

== Gallery ==
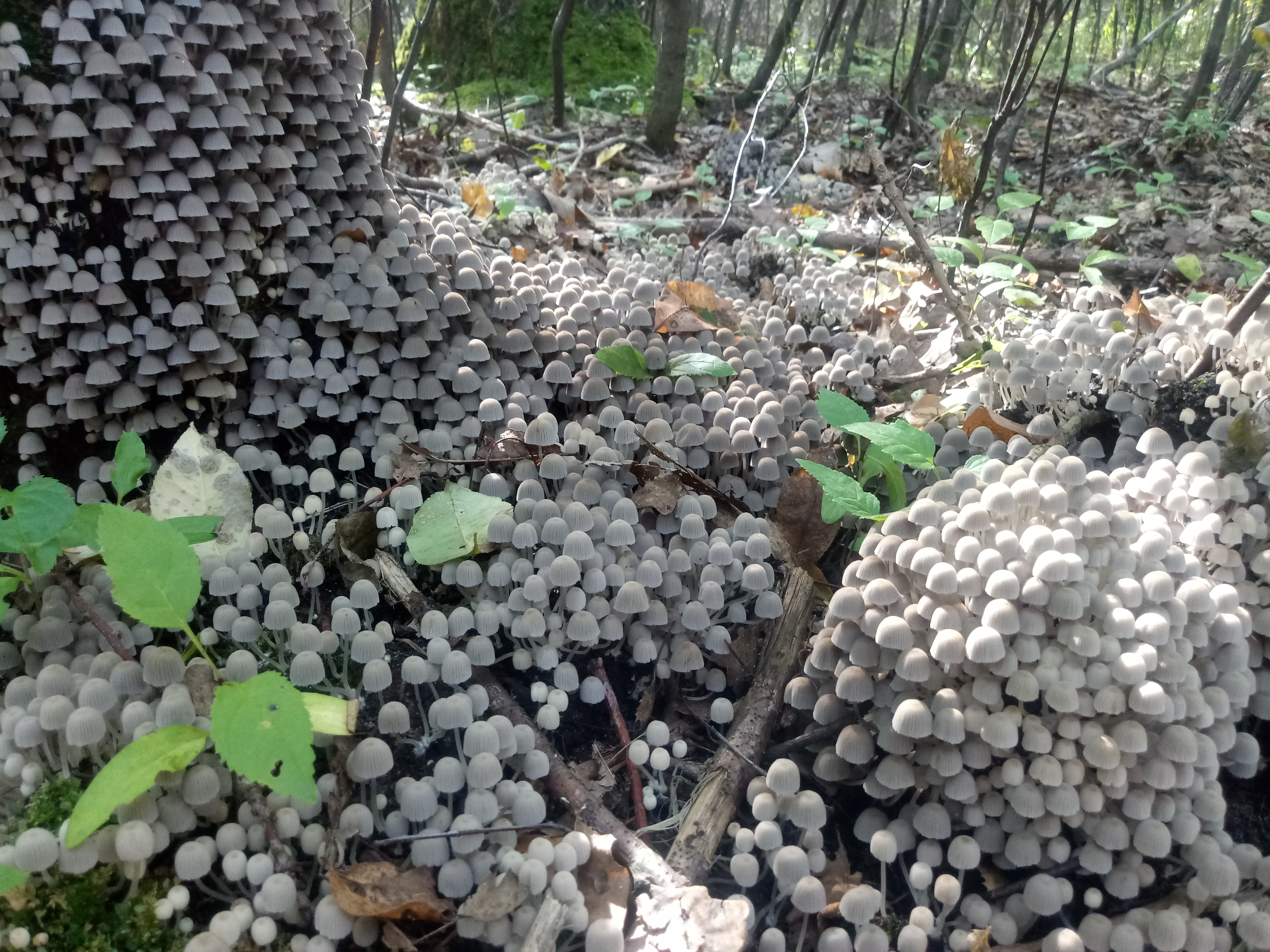
Coprinus disseminatus; commonly known as "fairy inkcap" or "trooping crumble cap"

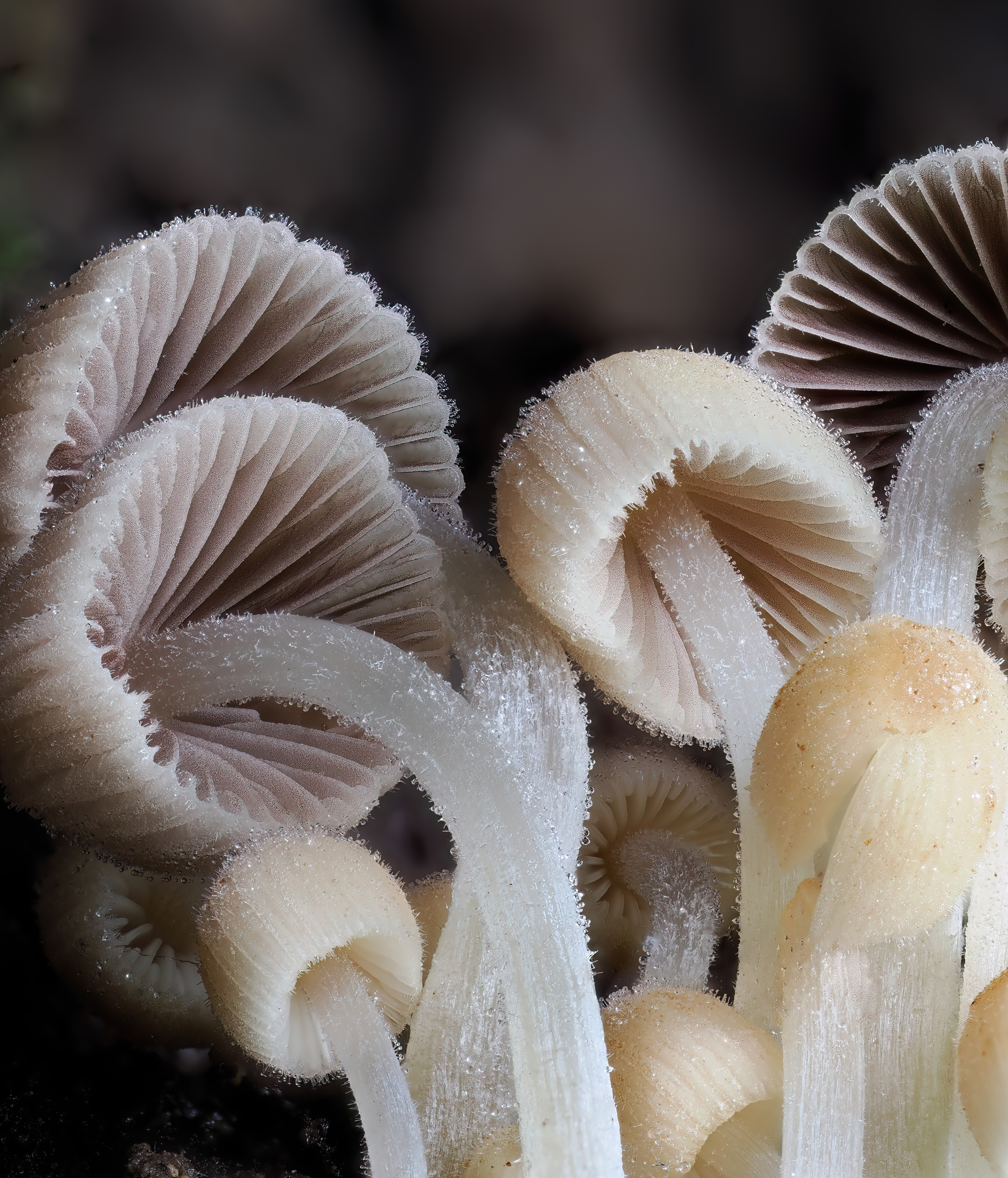
Trooping crumble caps closeup

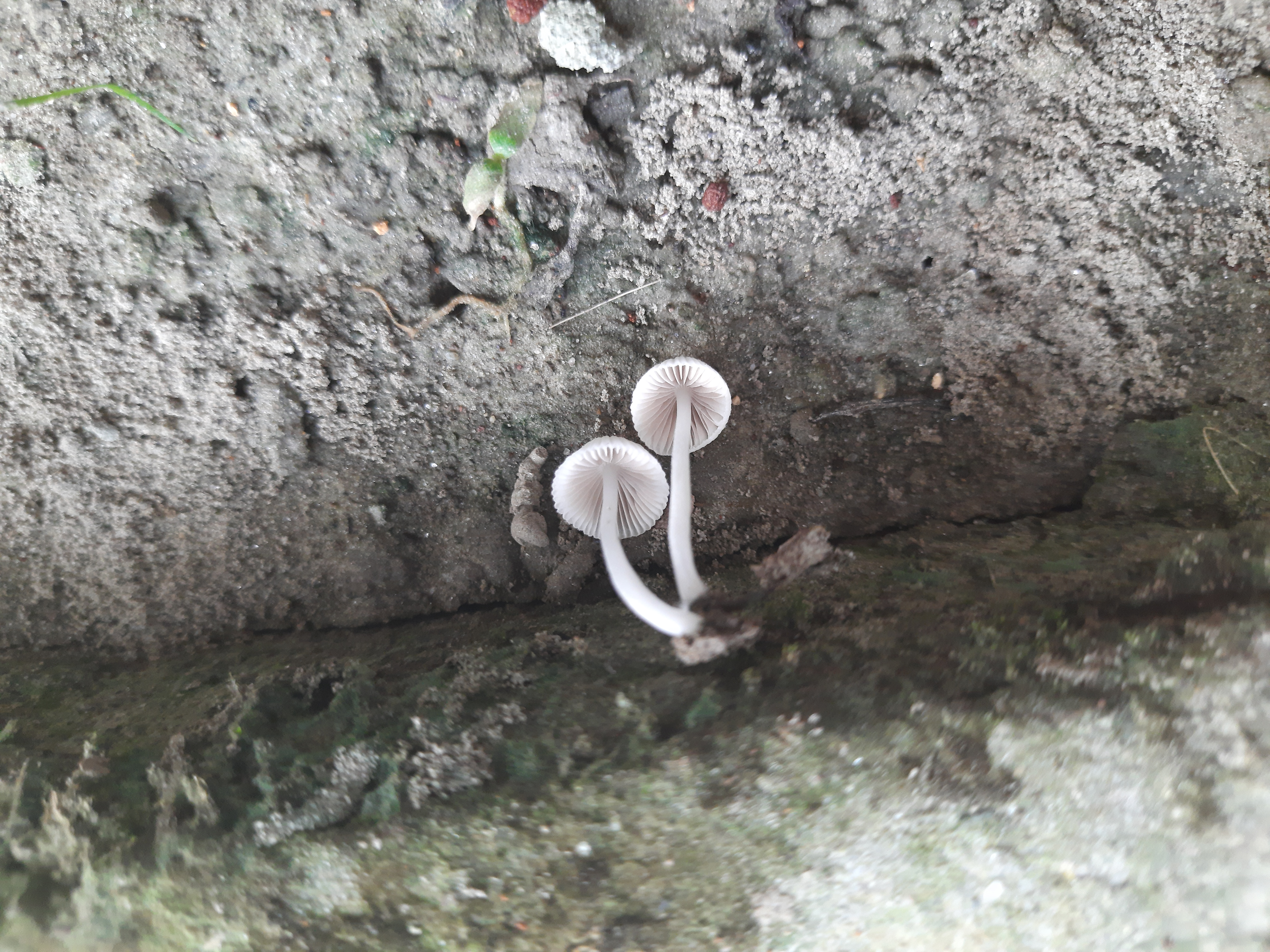
Gills of trooping crumble cap

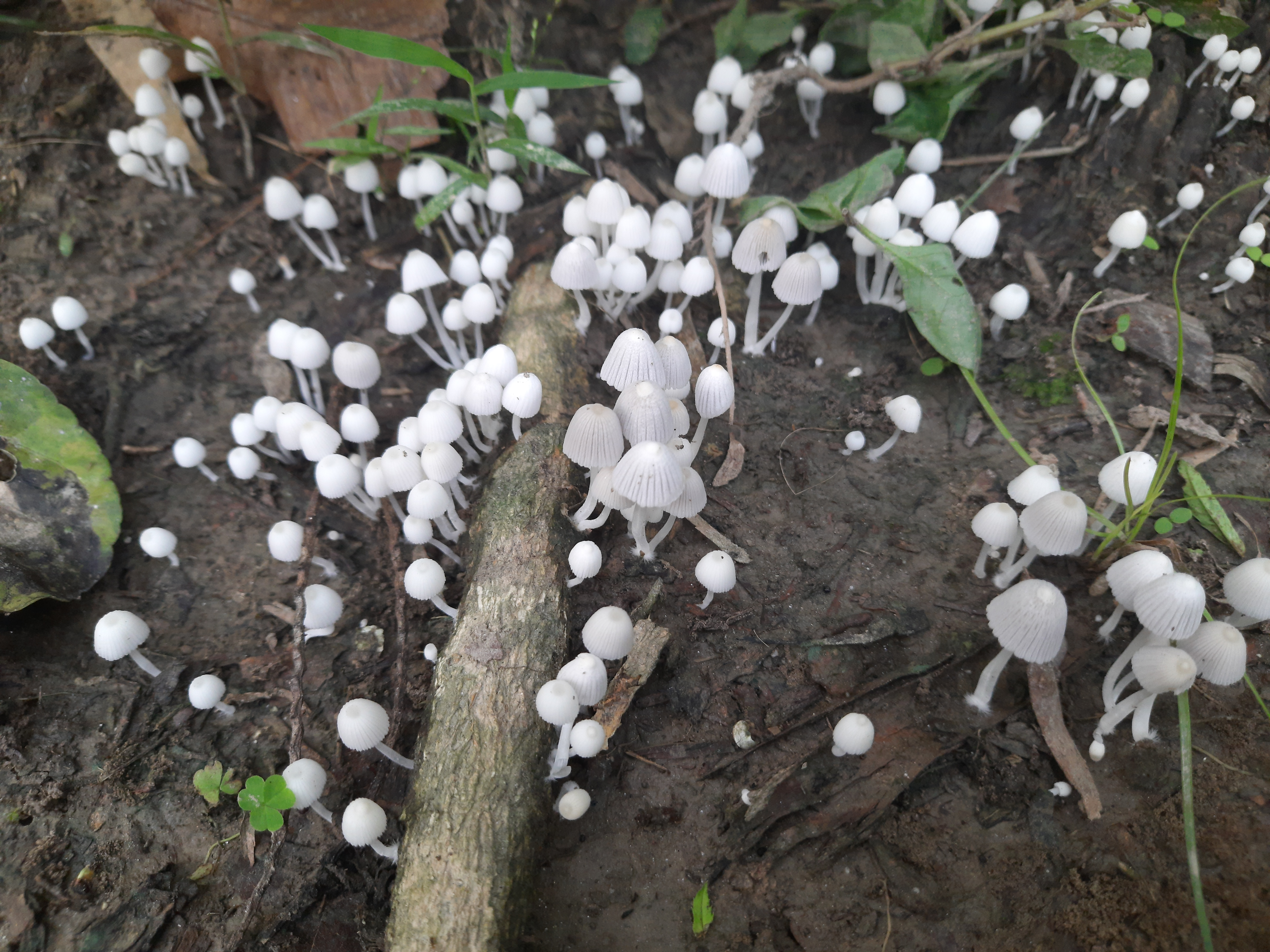
Trooping crumble caps

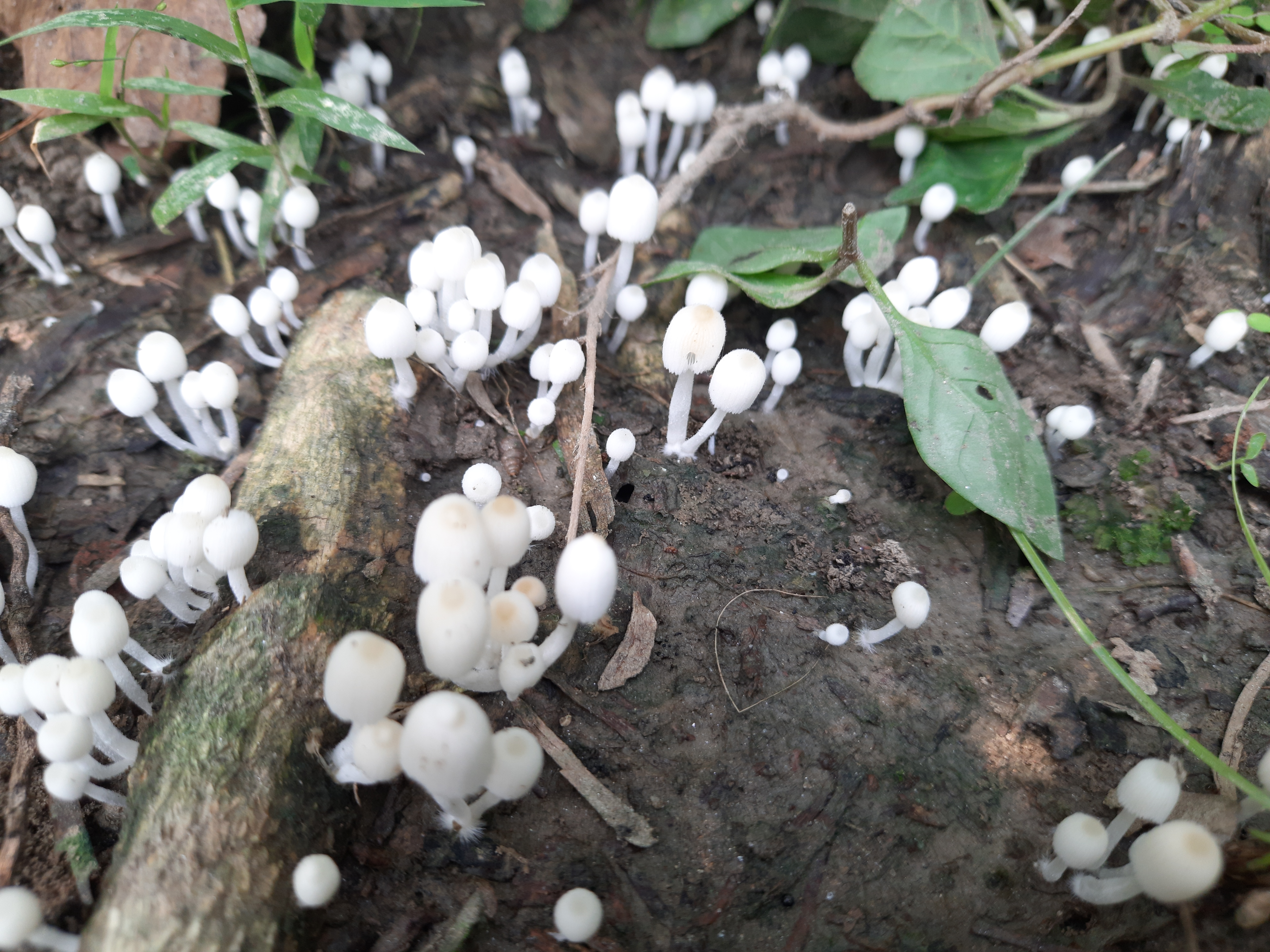
Newborn trooping crumble caps

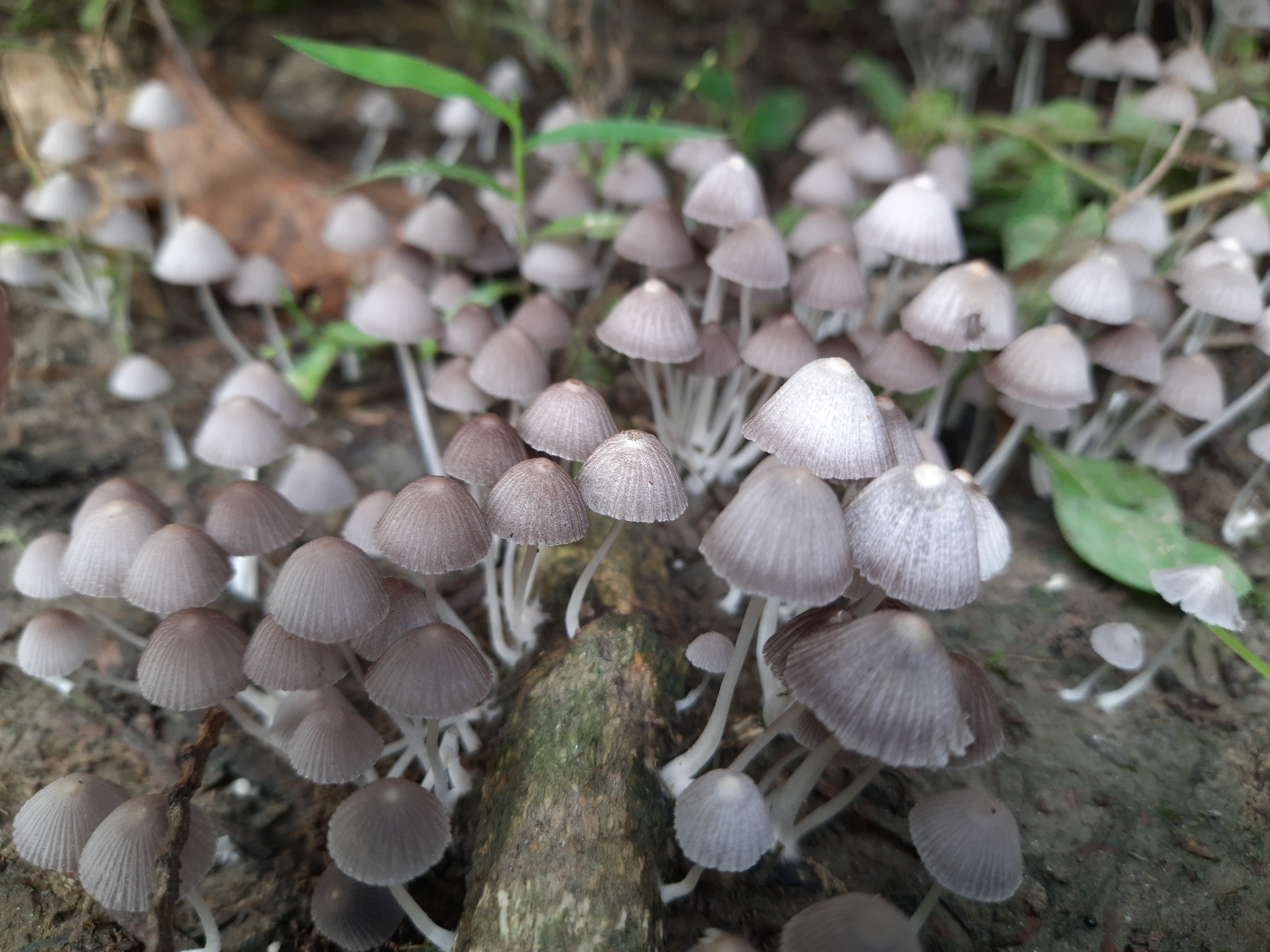
Trooping crumble caps

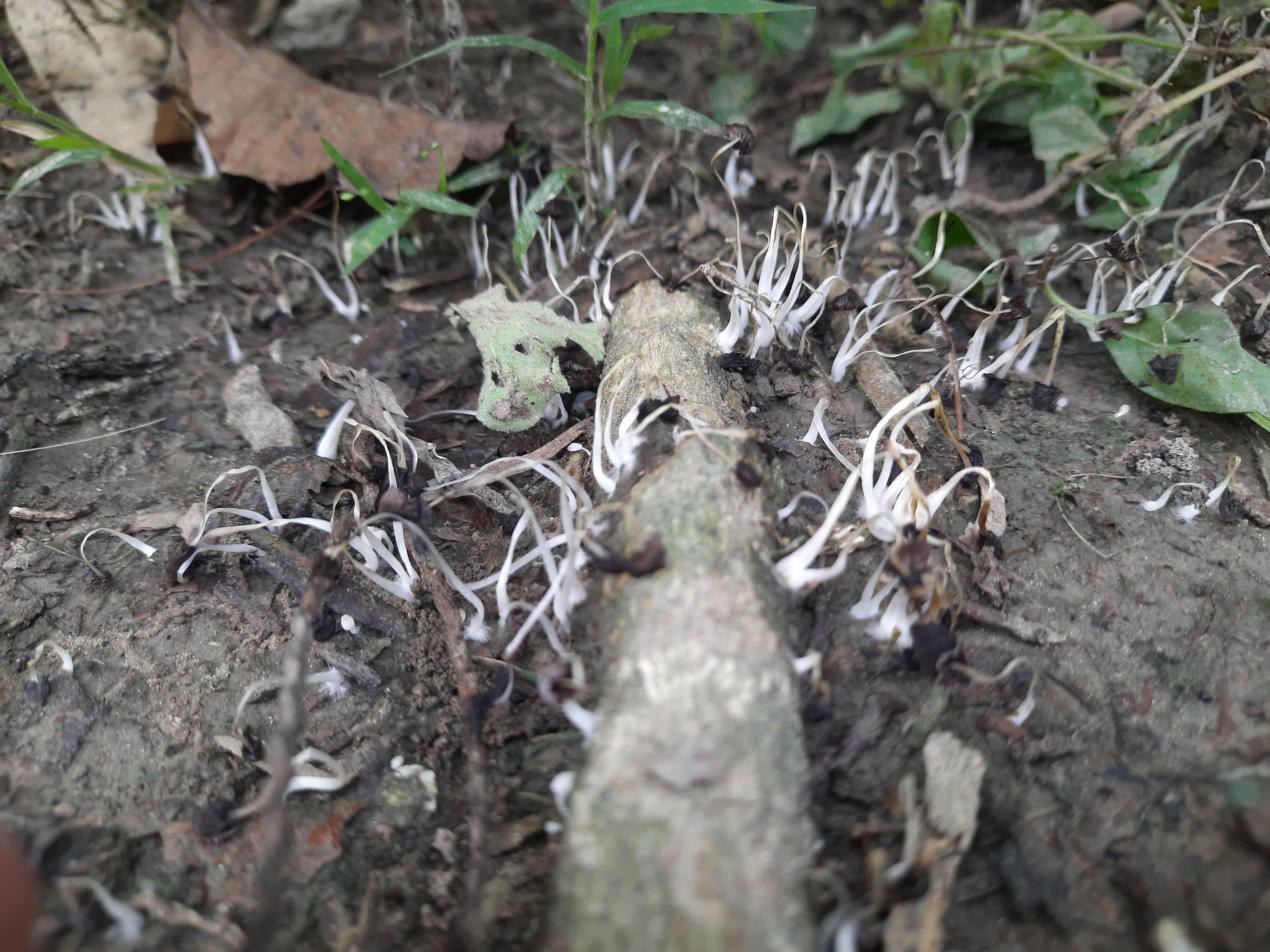
Dead trooping crumble caps

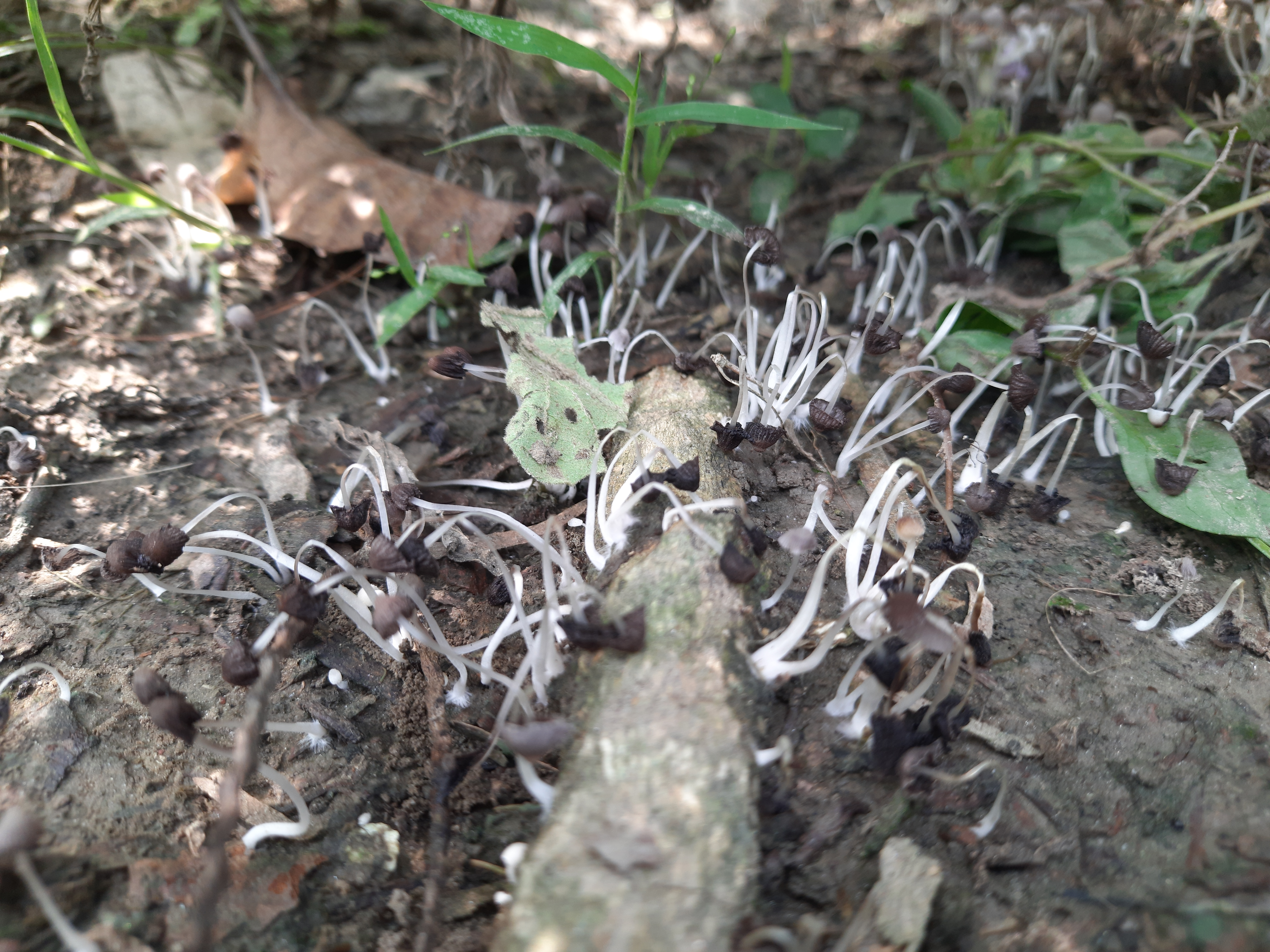
Dying trooping crumble cap

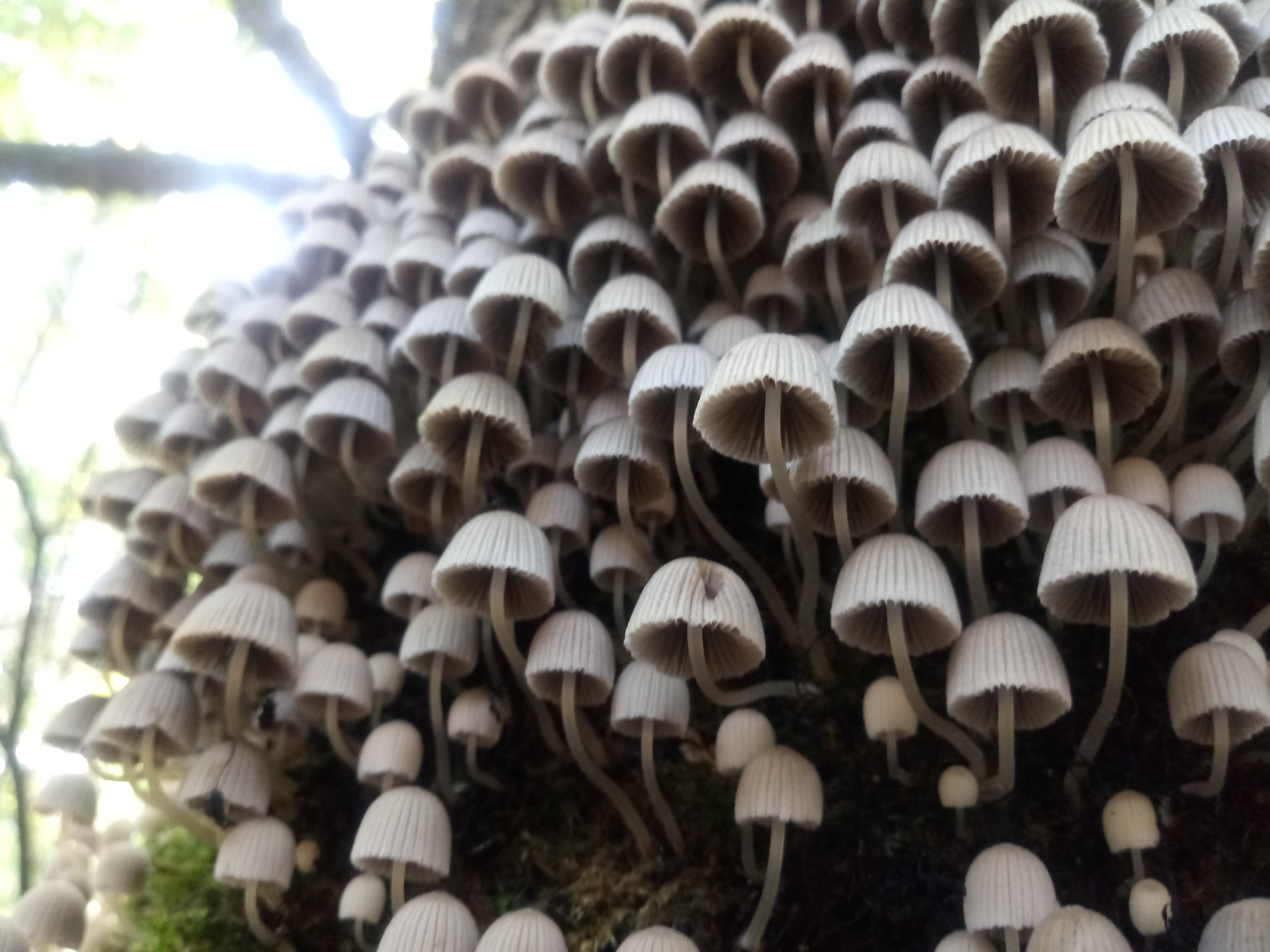
Coprinus disseminatus in a tree

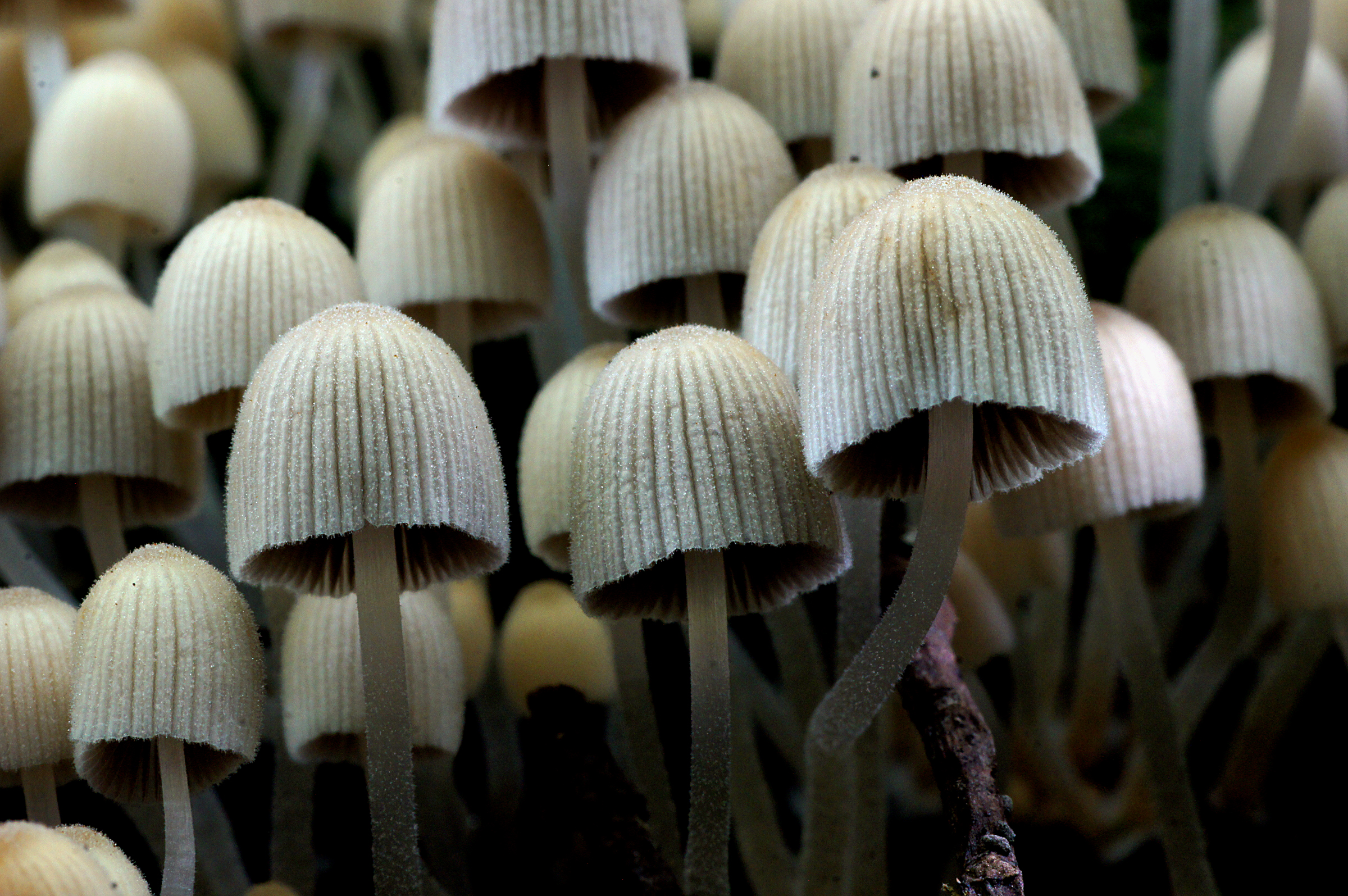
A close view of trooping crumble cap mushrooms.

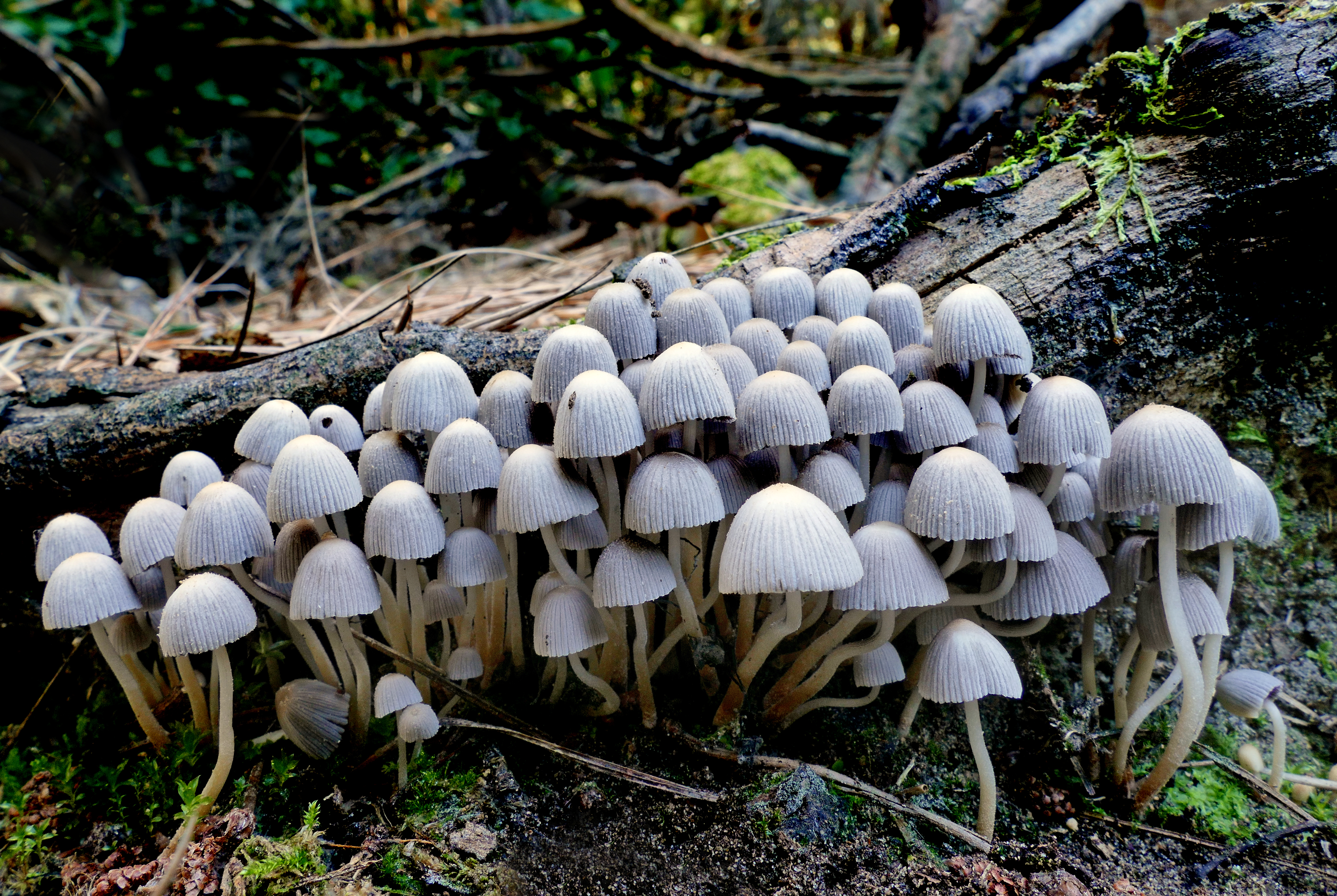
A colony of trooping crumble cap mushrooms.

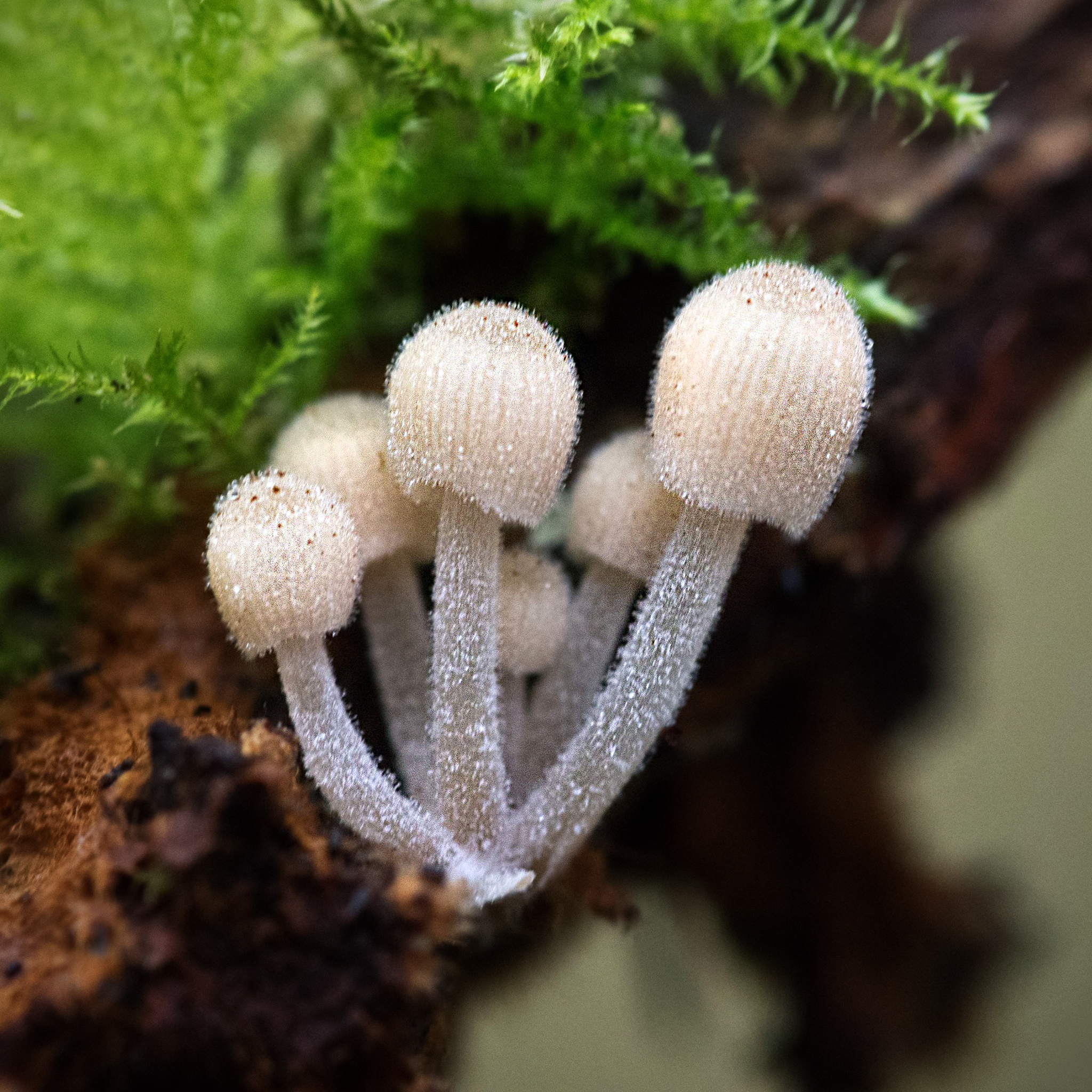
Newborn trooping crumble cap mushrooms.

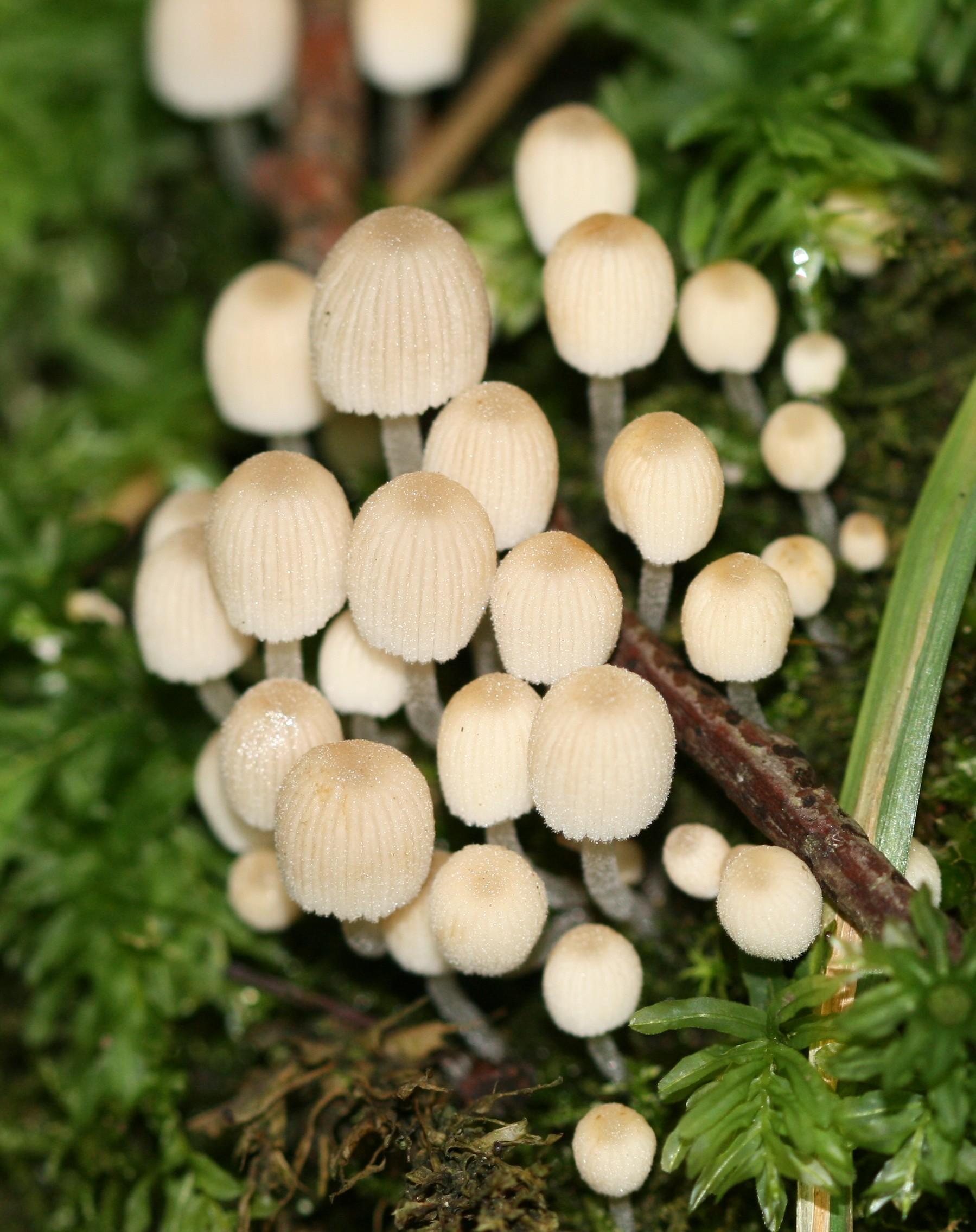
Trooping crumble cap mushrooms.

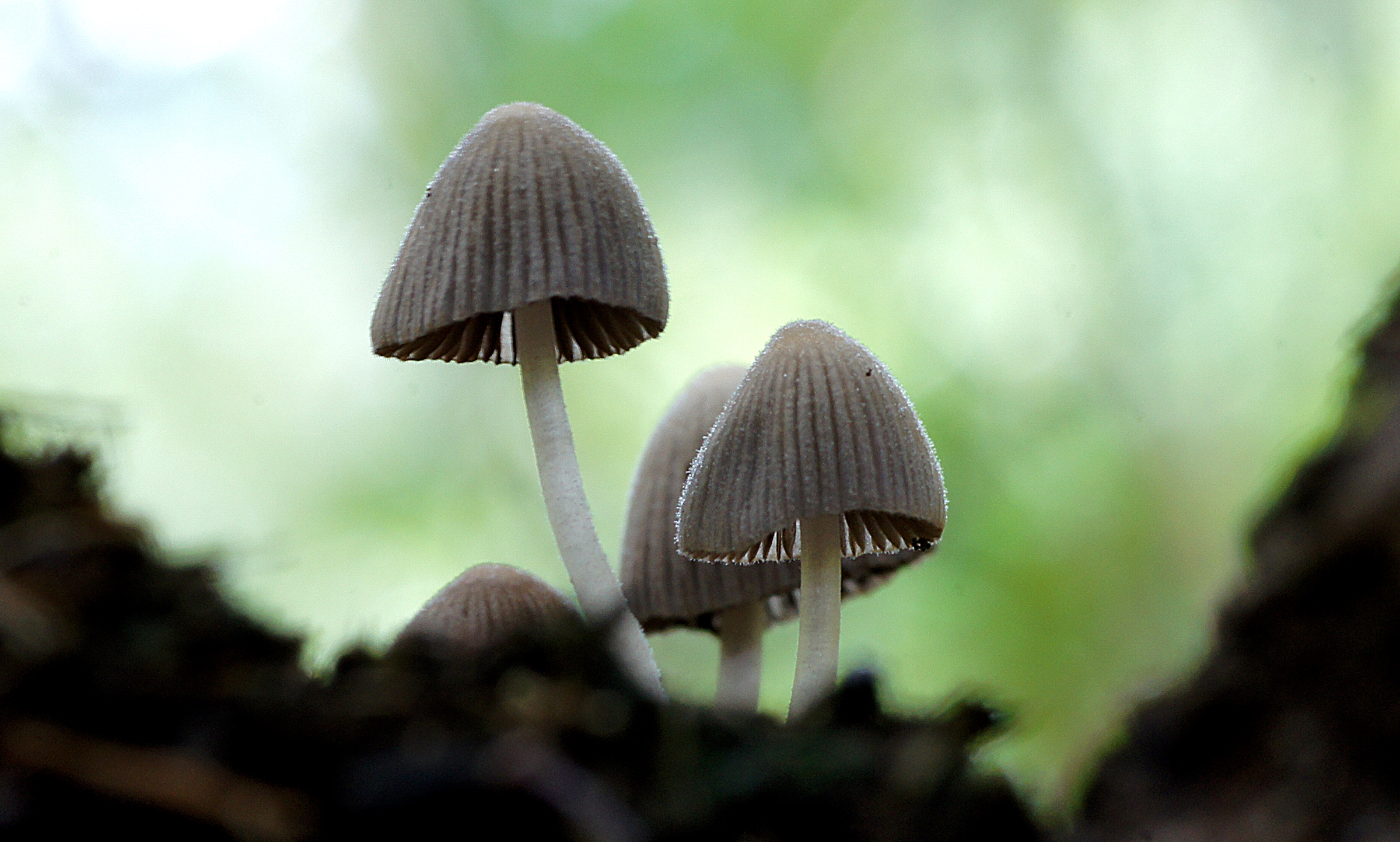
The fairy inkcap, Coprinellus disseminatus, rarely ventures forth alone

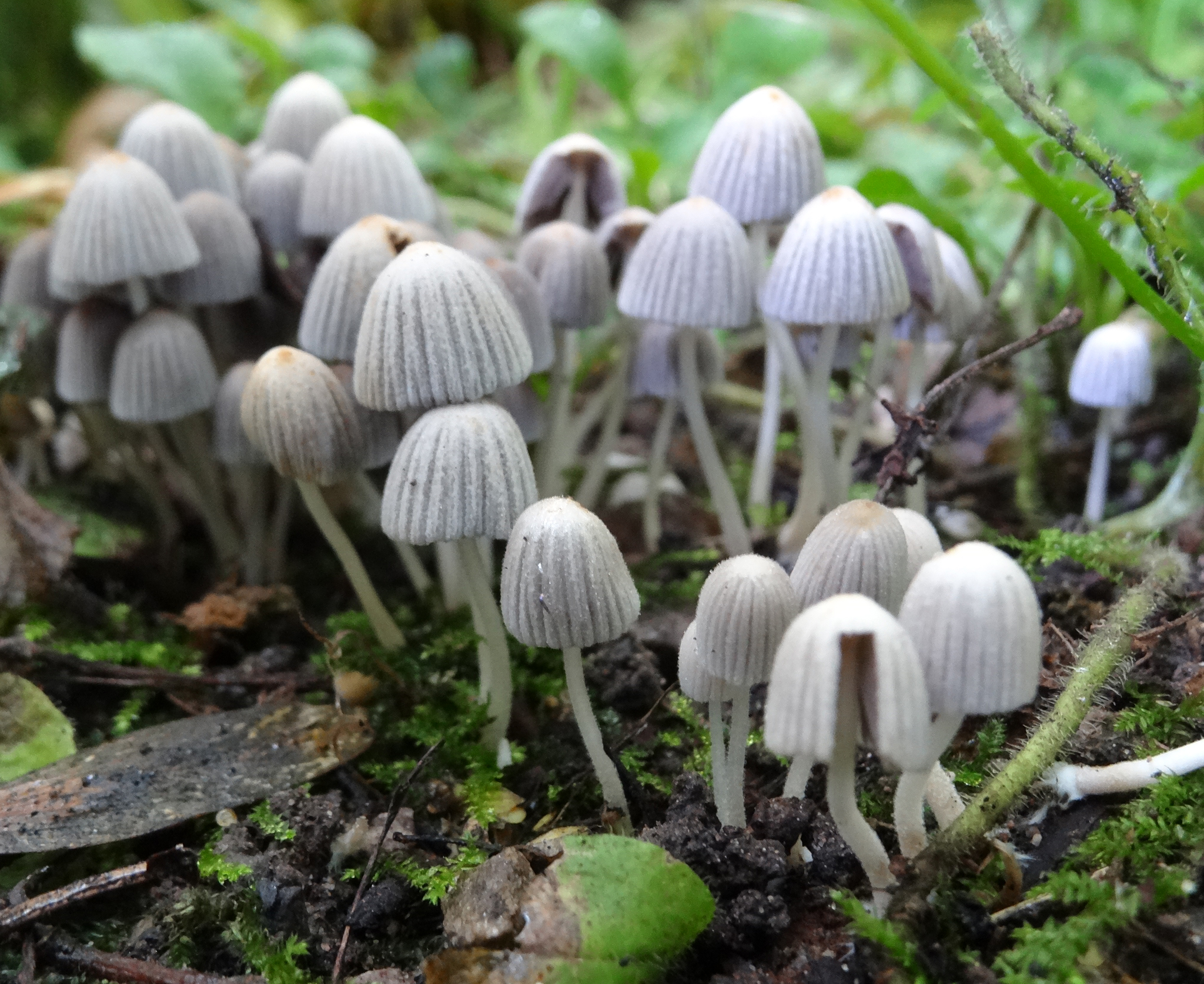
Fairy inkcap, Coprinellus disseminatus

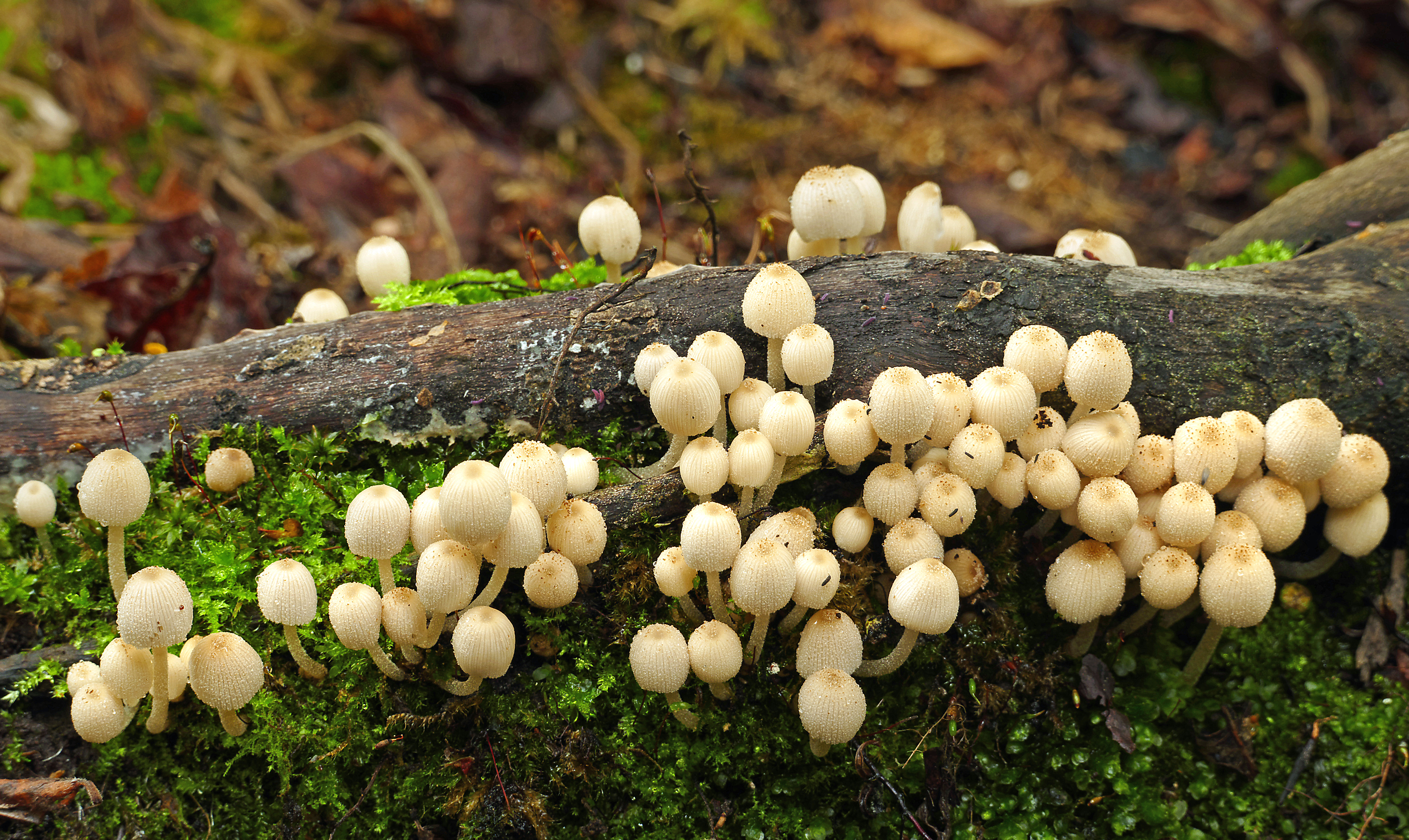
Newborn trooping crumble cap mushrooms.

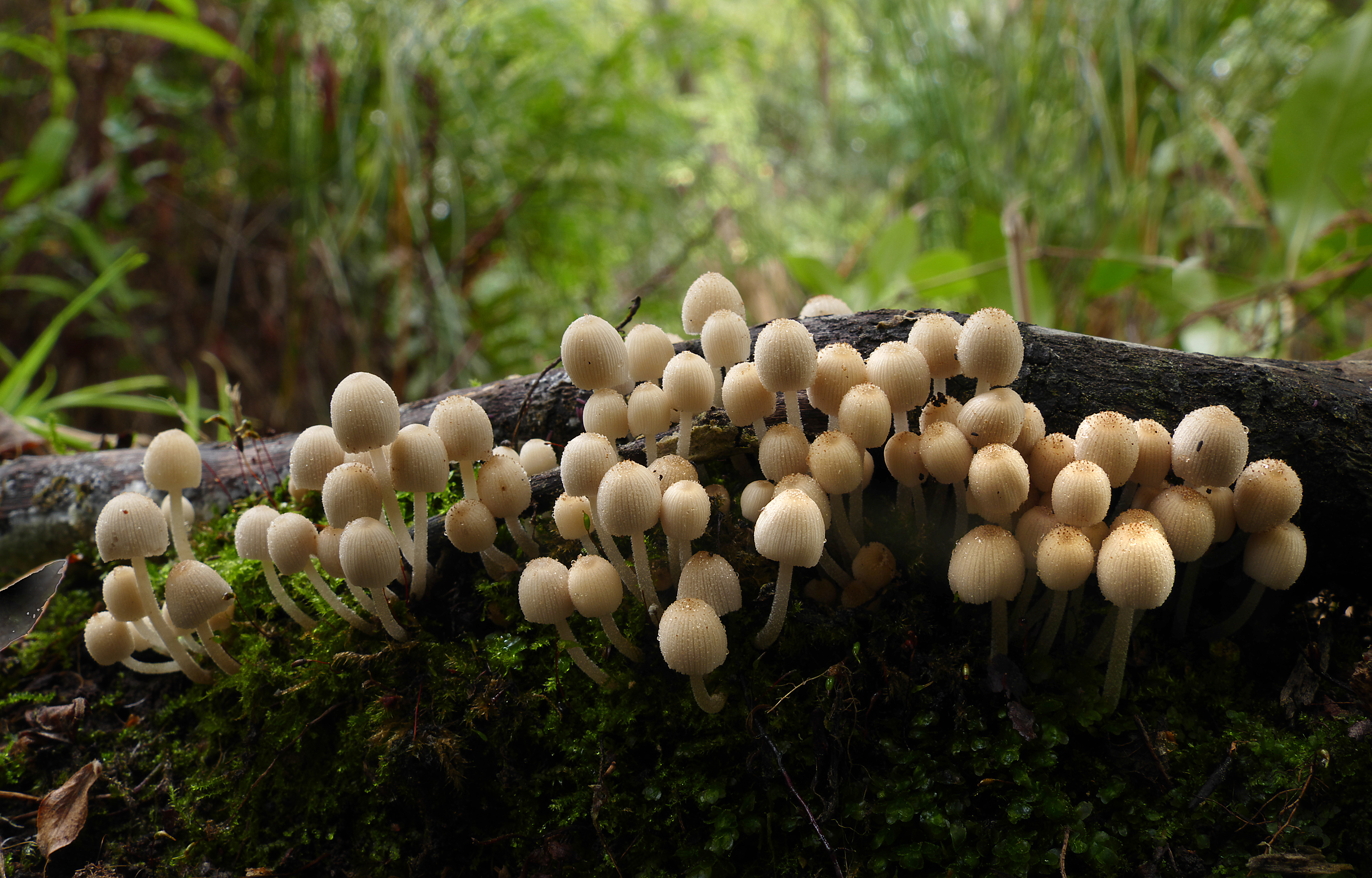
Trooping crumble cap mushrooms.
