= Coprinellus heptemerus =

Scientific classification
- Domain: Eukaryota
- Kingdom: Fungi
- Division: Basidiomycota
- Class: Agaricomycetes
- Order: Agaricales
- Family: Psathyrellaceae
- Genus: Coprinellus
- Species: C. heptemerus

Binomial name
- Coprinellus heptemerus (M. Lange & A.H.Sm.) Vilgalys, Hopple & Jacq.Johnson

Species of fungus

Coprinellus heptemerus is a species of mushroom in the family Psathyrellaceae. It was first described as Coprinus heptemerus by mycologists M. Lange and Alexander H. Smith in 1952, and later transferred to the genus Coprinellus in 2001. It is a coprophilous fungus and it is known to occur on the dung of goats and possibly on that of sheep.
