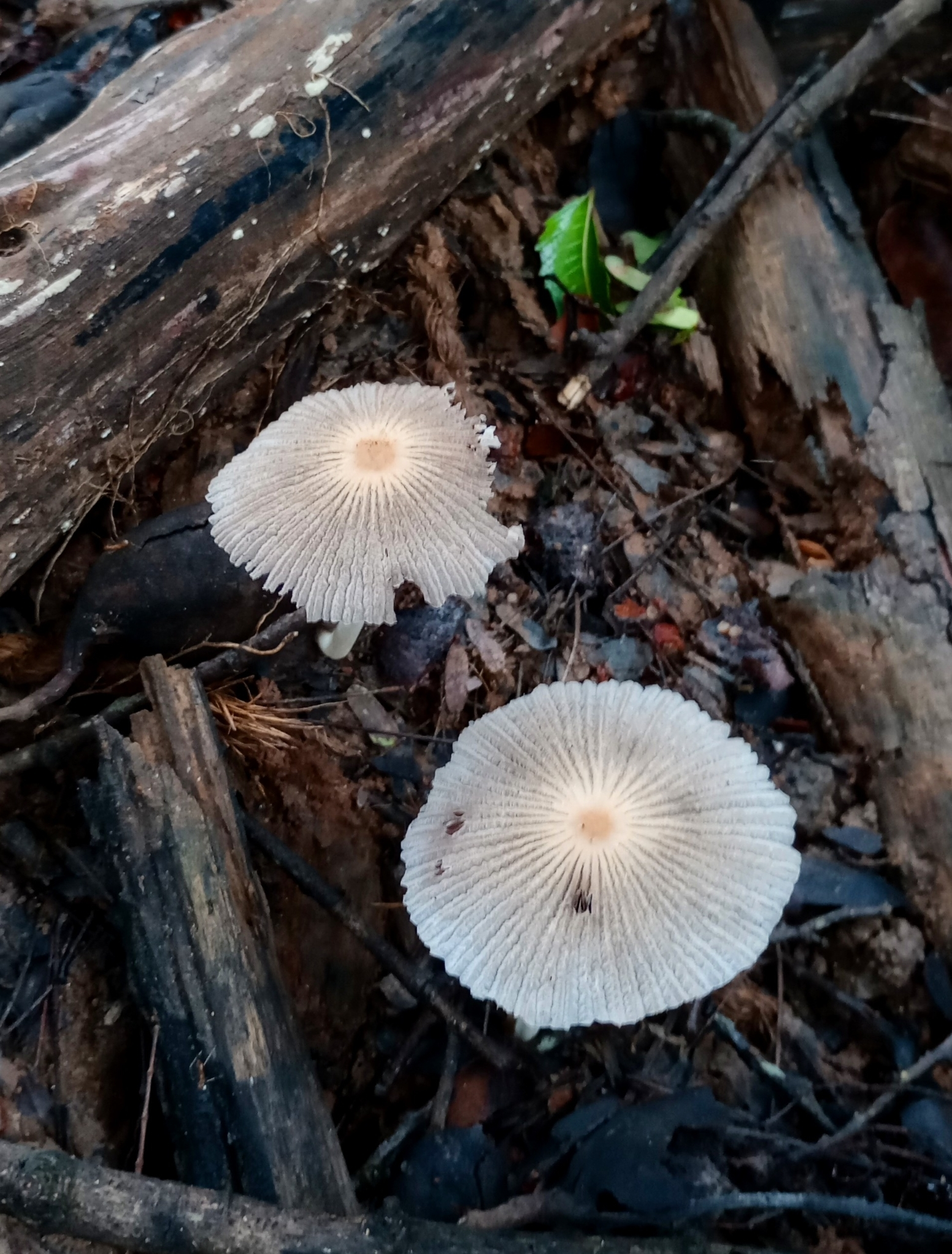

Scientific classification
- Domain: Eukaryota
- Kingdom: Fungi
- Division: Basidiomycota
- Class: Agaricomycetes
- Order: Agaricales
- Family: Psathyrellaceae
- Genus: Coprinellus
- Species: C. aureogranulatus

Binomial name
- Coprinellus aureogranulatus (Uljé & Aptroot) Redhead, Vilgalys & Moncalvo

Synonyms
- Coprinus aureogranulatus C.B. Uljé & A. Aptroot, 1998

= Coprinellus aureogranulatus =

Species of fungus

Coprinellus aureogranulatus is a species of mushroom in the family Psathyrellaceae. It was first described as Coprinus aureogranulatus by mycologists C.B. Uljé and A. Aptroot in 1998, and later transferred to the genus Coprinellus in 2001.
