= Coprinellus verrucispermus =

Scientific classification
- Domain: Eukaryota
- Kingdom: Fungi
- Division: Basidiomycota
- Class: Agaricomycetes
- Order: Agaricales
- Family: Psathyrellaceae
- Genus: Coprinellus
- Species: C. verrucispermus

Binomial name
- Coprinellus verrucispermus (Joss. & Enderle) Redhead, Vilgalys & Moncalvo

Synonyms
- Coprinus verrucispermus Joss. & Enderle (1988)

Species of fungus

Coprinellus verrucispermus is a species of fungus in the family Psathyrellaceae. The fungus has been identified in a study of soils from the northern-central region of New South Wales, Australia. Formerly in the genus Coprinus, it was given its current name in 2001.
