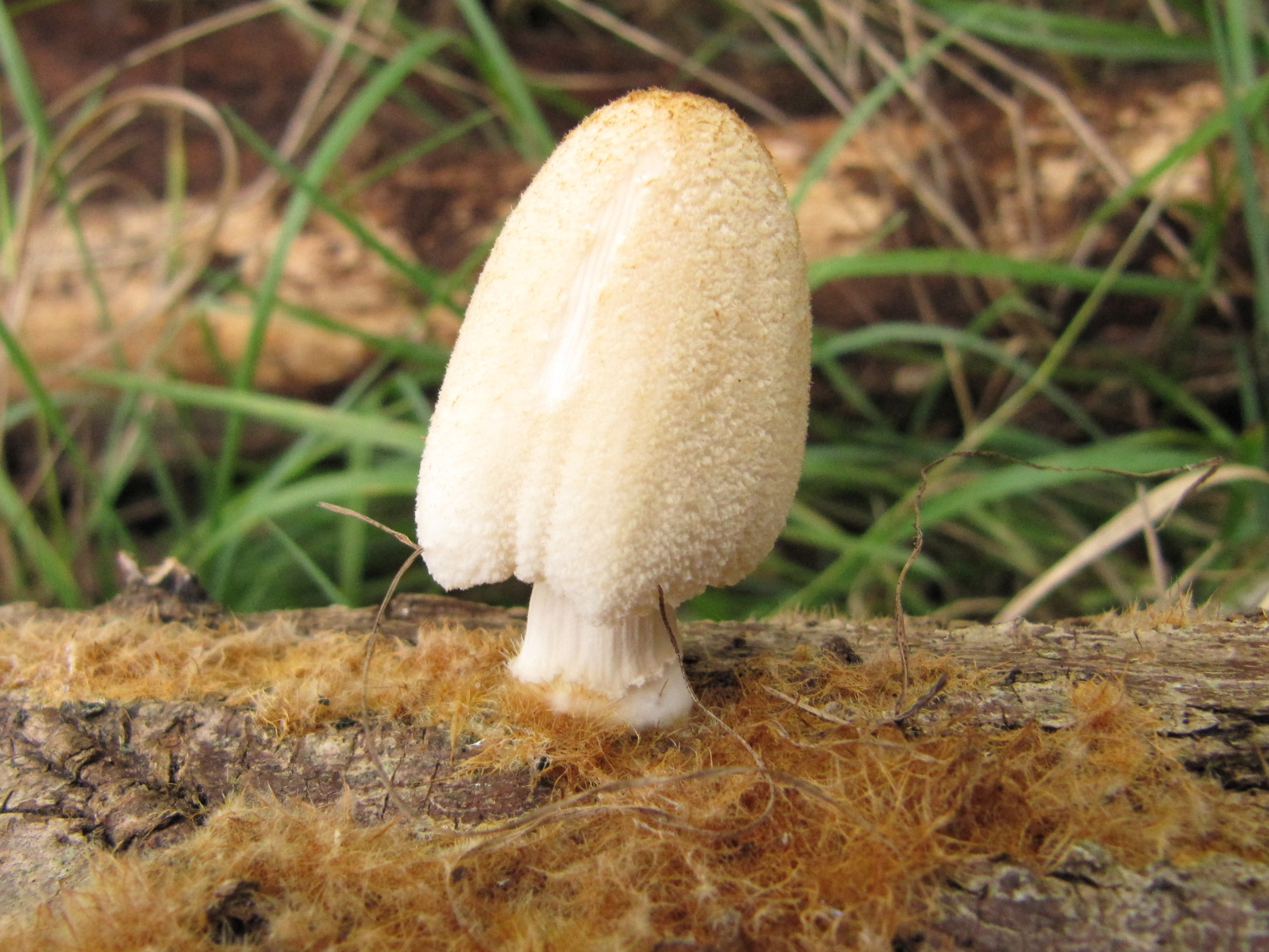

Scientific classification
- Kingdom: Fungi
- Division: Basidiomycota
- Class: Agaricomycetes
- Order: Agaricales
- Family: Psathyrellaceae
- Genus: Coprinellus
- Species: C. ellisii

Binomial name
- Coprinellus ellisii (P.D.Orton) Redhead, Vilgalys & Moncalvo (2001)

Synonyms
- Coprinus ellisii P.D.Orton (1960)

= Coprinellus ellisii =

Species of fungus

Coprinellus ellisii is a species of mushroom in the family Psathyrellaceae. Found in Europe, it was first described as Coprinus ellisii by Peter D. Orton in 1960, and later transferred to the genus Coprinellus in 2001. The specific epithet ellisii honours E.A. Ellis, who, according to Orton, was "the Norfolk naturalist and mycologist who collected this and who brought me many puzzling and apparently undescribed agarics."
