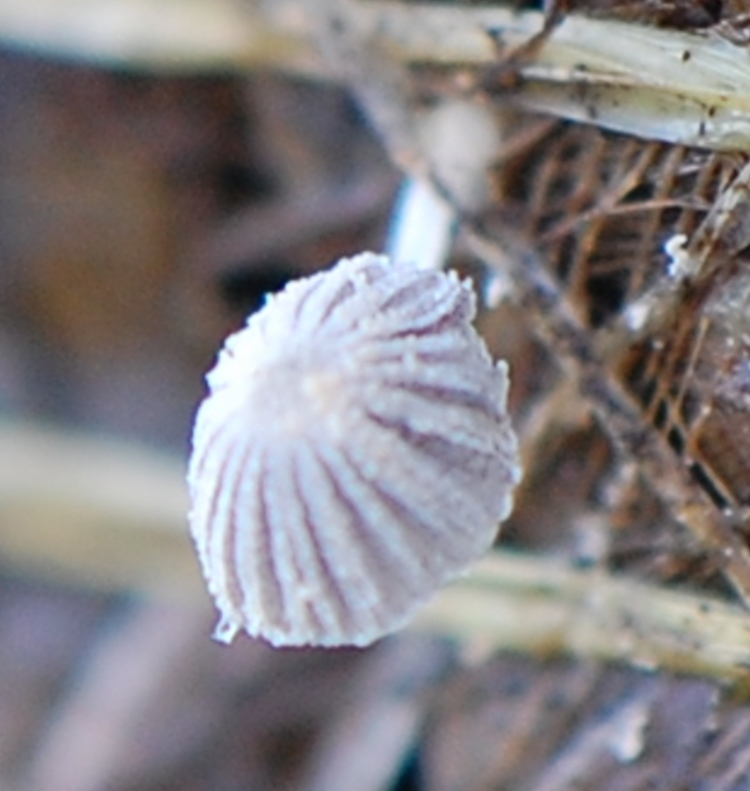

Scientific classification
- Domain: Eukaryota
- Kingdom: Fungi
- Division: Basidiomycota
- Class: Agaricomycetes
- Order: Agaricales
- Family: Psathyrellaceae
- Genus: Coprinellus
- Species: C. curtus

Binomial name
- Coprinellus curtus (Kalchbr.) Vilgalys, Hopple & Jacq. Johnson

= Coprinellus curtus =

Species of fungus

Coprinellus curtus is a species of mushroom in the family Psathyrellaceae. It was first described as Coprinus curtus by Károly Kalchbrenner in 1876 before being transferred to the genus Coprinellus in 2001.

A strain of this fungus (named GM-21) produces an anti-fungal compound known to inhibit bottom-rot disease of Chinese cabbage (Brassica campestris) caused by the plant pathogen Rhizonoctonia solani.

It is a coprophilous fungus and it is known to grow on the dung of donkeys, sheep and goats.
