= Coprinellus dilectus =

Scientific classification
- Domain: Eukaryota
- Kingdom: Fungi
- Division: Basidiomycota
- Class: Agaricomycetes
- Order: Agaricales
- Family: Psathyrellaceae
- Genus: Coprinellus
- Species: C. dilectus

Binomial name
- Coprinellus dilectus (Fr.) Redhead, Vilgalys & Moncalvo (2001)

Synonyms
- Coprinus dilectus Fr. (1838)

Species of fungus

Coprinellus dilectus is a species of mushroom in the family Psathyrellaceae. It was first described as Coprinus dilectus by mycologist Elias Magnus Fries in 1838, and later transferred to the genus Coprinellus in 2001.
