= Coprinellus deliquescens =

Scientific classification
- Domain: Eukaryota
- Kingdom: Fungi
- Division: Basidiomycota
- Class: Agaricomycetes
- Order: Agaricales
- Family: Psathyrellaceae
- Genus: Coprinellus
- Species: C. deliquescens

Binomial name
- Coprinellus deliquescens (Bull.) P. Karst.

Species of fungus

Coprinellus deliquescens is the type species of mushrooms in its genus and belongs to the family Psathyrellaceae. It was first described as Agaricus deliquescens in 1790 by French mycologist Bulliard before being transferred to the genus Coprinellus in 1879 by Petter Karsten.
