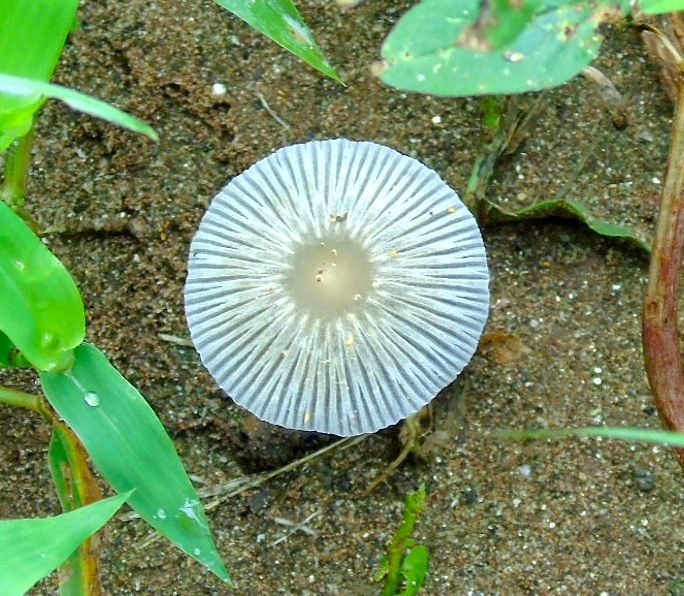

Scientific classification
- Kingdom: Fungi
- Division: Basidiomycota
- Class: Agaricomycetes
- Order: Agaricales
- Family: Psathyrellaceae
- Genus: Punjabia; D. Wächt & A. Melzer (2020)

Type species
- Punjabia pakistanicus (Usman & Khalid) D. Wächt & A. Melzer (2020)

= Punjabia =

Genus of fungi

Punjabia is a genus of fungi in the family Psathyrellaceae. The genus is monotypic and contains the single species Punjabia pakistanicus which was previously classified as Coprinellus pakistanicus.

== Taxonomy ==
The Punjabia genus was created in 2020 by the German mycologists Dieter Wächter & Andreas Melzer when the Psathyrellaceae family was subdivided based on phylogenetic analysis. Several members of the Psathyrella genus were reclassified and placed in new genera. A single species was placed in Punjabia.

The type species, Punjabia pakistanicus was previously known as Coprinellus pakistanicus after being classified by the mycologists Muhammad Usman and Abdul Nasir Khalid in 2018 from a discovery in Pakistan.

== Etymology ==
The genus is named after the Pakistani province of Punjab where the type species was documented.

Coprinellus pakistanicus was named for the location in which this species was discovered, Pakistan.

== Habitat and distribution ==
Found in lowlands on moist soil under Acacia trees in Northern Pakistan.

== Species ==
Species include:

- Punjabia pakistanicus
