= Henri Romagnesi =

French mycologist (1912–1999)

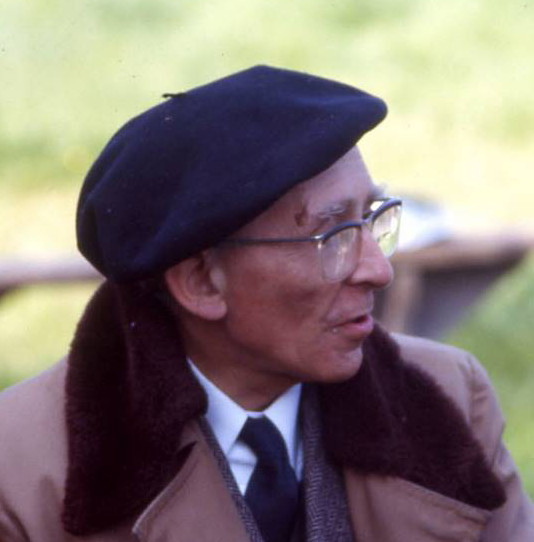
- Born: 7 February 1912; Paris
- Died: 18 January 1999 (aged 86); Draveil, Essonne, France
- Known for: Describing several species in the genus Russula
- Scientific career
- Fields: Mycology
- Author abbrev. (botany): Romagn.

Henri Charles Louis Romagnesi (7 February 1912 – 18 January 1999) was a French mycologist who was notable for a thorough review and monograph of the agaric genus Entoloma (or Rhodophyllus as it was known in the early 20th century), as well as extensive work on the large genus Russula, of which he described several new species.

== See also ==
- List of mycologists
