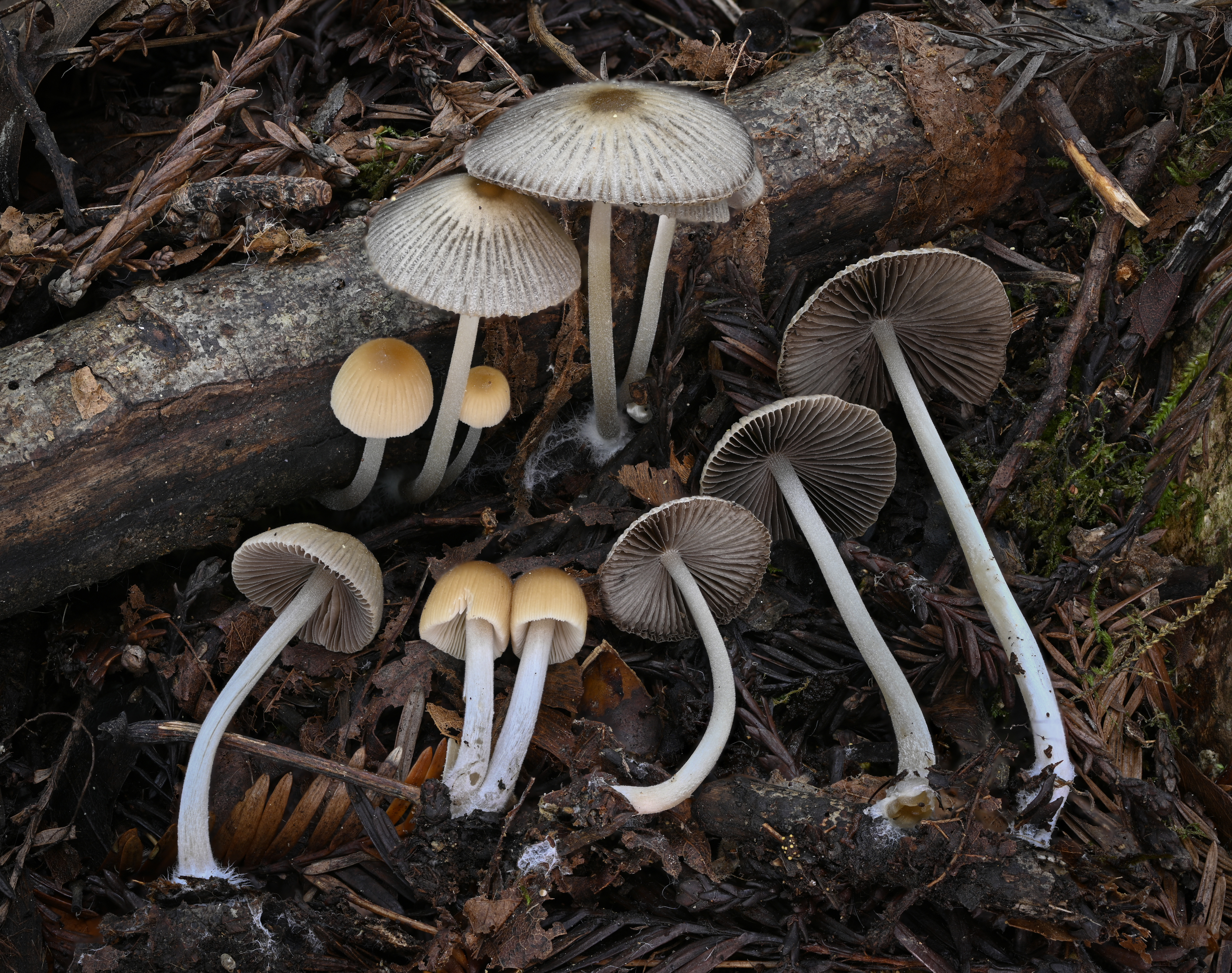

Scientific classification
- Kingdom: Fungi
- Division: Basidiomycota
- Class: Agaricomycetes
- Order: Agaricales
- Family: Psathyrellaceae
- Genus: Tulosesus
- Species: T. impatiens

Binomial name
- Tulosesus impatiens (Fr.) D. Wächt & A. Melzer (2020)

Synonyms
- Agaricus impatiens Fr. (1821); Coprinarius impatiens Quél. (1886); Coprinus impatiens Quél. (1888); Pseudocoprinus impatiens Kühner (1936); Psathyrella impatiens Gillet (1936); Coprinellus impatiens J.E.Lange (1938)

= Tulosesus impatiens =

Species of fungus

Tulosesus impatiens
- Mycological characteristics
- Gills on hymenium
- Cap is convex or flat
- Hymenium is adnexed
- Stipe is bare
- Spore print is blackish-brown
- Ecology is saprotrophic
- Edibility is inedible

Tulosesus impatiens (formerly Coprinellus impatiens) is a species of fungus in the family Psathyrellaceae. First described in 1821, it has been classified variously in the genera Psathyrella, Pseudocoprinus, Coprinarius, and Coprinus, before molecular phylogenetics reaffirmed it as a Coprinellus species in 2001. In 2020, German mycologists Dieter Wächter and Andreas Melzer reclassified many species of the Psathyrellaceae family based on a phylogenetic analysis and the species was renamed Tulosesus impatiens.

The fungus is found in North America and Europe, where the mushrooms grow on the ground in deciduous forests. The fruit bodies have buff caps that are up to 4 cm (1.6 in) in diameter, held by slender whitish stems that can be up to 10 cm (3.9 in) tall. Several other Coprinopsis species that resemble T. impatiens may be distinguished by differences in appearance, habit, or spore morphology.

== Taxonomy and phylogeny ==
The species was first described in 1821 as Agaricus impatiens by Swedish mycologist Elias Magnus Fries in his Systema Mycologicum. In 1886, Lucien Quélet transferred the species to Coprinarius (a defunct genus now synonymous with Panaeolus) and then to Coprinus a couple of years later in his Flore Mycologique de la France. In 1936, Robert Kühner segregated the genus Pseudocoprinus from Coprinus, including species that did not have deliquescent gills (that is, gills that "melt" into liquid), and he included Coprinus impatiens in this generic transfer. He later changed his mind about the taxonomic separation of Coprinus and Pseudocoprinus. Gillet transferred the species to Psathyrella in 1936. In 1938 Jakob Emanuel Lange published the new combination Coprinellus impatiens. Despite the taxonomic shuffling, the species was popularly known as Coprinus impatiens until 2001, when a large-scale phylogenetic analysis resulted in the splitting of the genus Coprinus into several smaller genera, and the authors confirmed the validity of the generic placement in Coprinellus. The specific epithet impatiens is derived from the Latin word for "impatient".

A 2005 phylogenetics study proposed that C. impatiens was sister (closely related on the phylogenetic tree) to a large Psathyrella clade, and that consequently, the genus Coprinellus was polyphyletic. A later (2008) study suggested, however, that these results were due to an artifact of taxon sampling—not enough species were analyzed to adequately represent the genetic variation in the genera. The 2008 study demonstrated that Coprinellus, at that time including T. impatiens, was monophyletic, descended from a common ancestor. In their analysis, T. impatiens was most closely related to T. congregatus, T. bisporus, T. callinus, and T. heterosetulosus.

The species was known as Coprinellus impatiens until 2020 when the German mycologists Dieter Wächter & Andreas Melzer reclassified many species in the Psathyrellaceae family based on phylogenetic analysis.

== Description ==
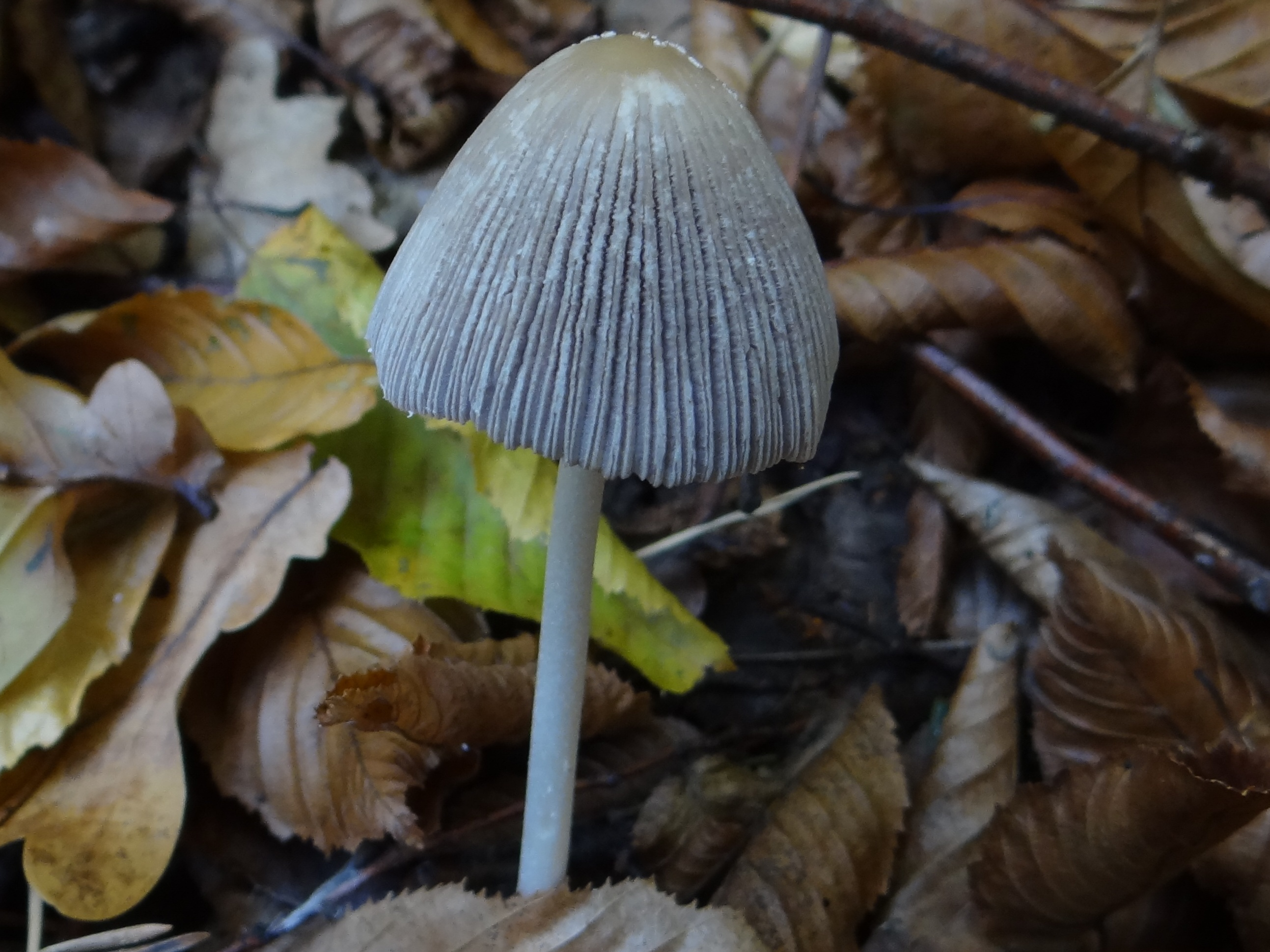
The cap surface has deep, narrow, radially arranged grooves.

The cap of the fruit bodies is initially egg-shaped, then conical to convex before flattening out, reaching diameters between 1.8 to 4 cm (0.71 to 1.57 in). It has deep narrow grooves reaching almost as far as the center of the cap. The surface color is a pale buff, tawny or cinnamon towards the center, but the color loses intensity when the mushroom is dry. The flesh is whitish, thin, fragile and barely deliquescent (auto-digesting). The gills are initially buff, then turn grayish brown. They are either free from attachment to the stem, or adnexed, meaning only a small portion of the gill is attached. The stem is whitish, very slender, and more or less equal in width throughout its length, or slightly thicker at the base; its dimensions are 7 to 10 cm (2.8 to 3.9 in) by 0.2 to 0.4 cm (0.08 to 0.16 in) thick. The stem surface of young specimens are pruinose—appearing to be coated with a minute layer of fine white particles; this eventually is sloughed off, leaving a smooth or silky surface. The odor and taste of the fruit bodies are not distinctive. The gills of this species do not autodigest with age, or barely do so; the fruit bodies tend to become more fragile with age.

The spore print is dark brown. The spores are smooth, ellipsoid or almond-shaped, with a germ pore; they measure 9–12 by 5–6 μm. The spore-bearing cells, the basidia, are four-spored and tetramorphic (the spores lie on several different levels, and mature at different times). The cheilocystidia (cystidia found on the gill edge) are roughly spherical, 20–35 μm broad, or lageniform (flask-shaped), 36–64 by 10–15 μm, with the apex often rather acute, about 3–5 μm wide. Pleurocystidia (cystidia found on the gill face) are absent in this species.

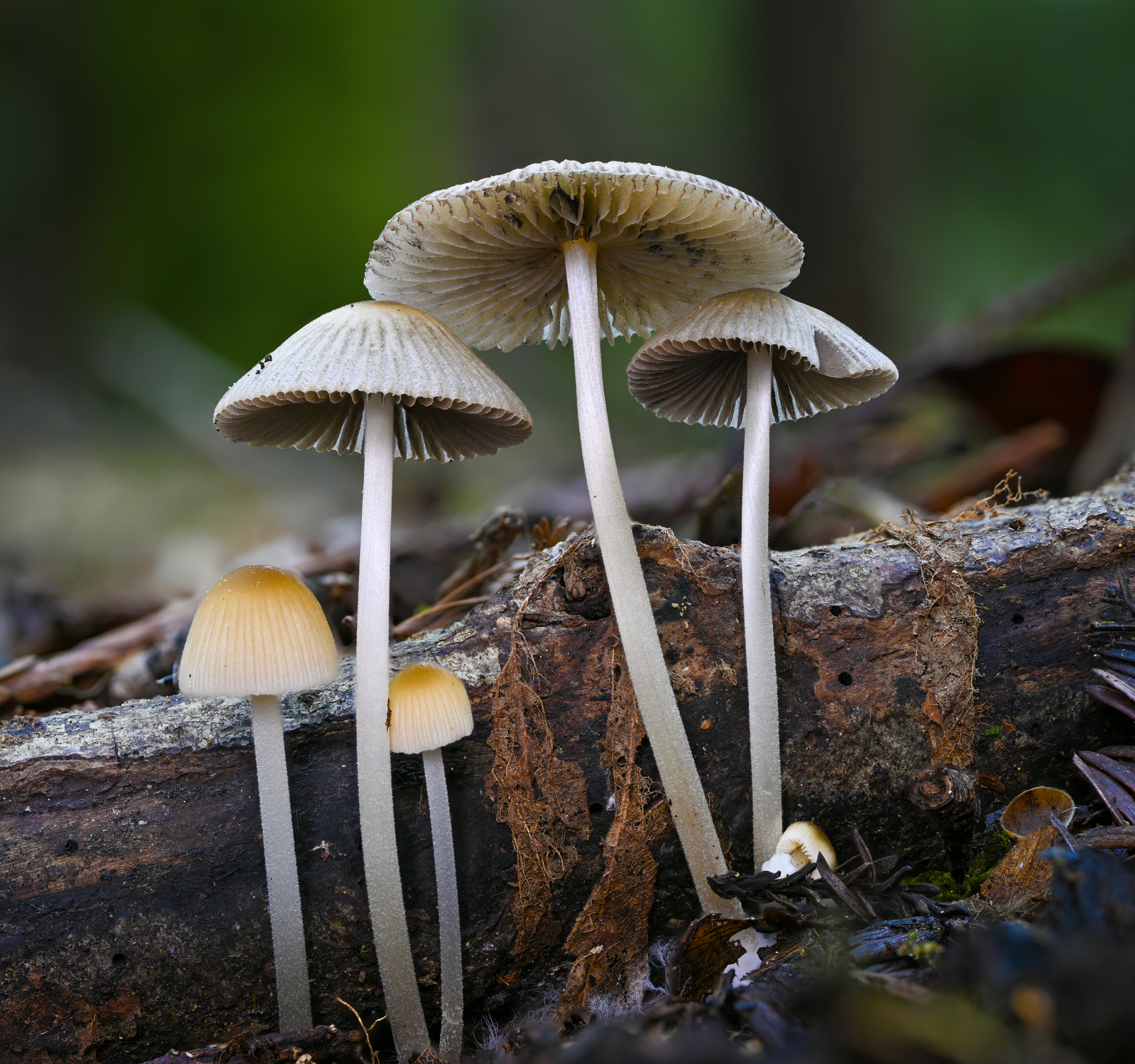
Tulosesus impatiens young fruit bodies

== Similar species ==
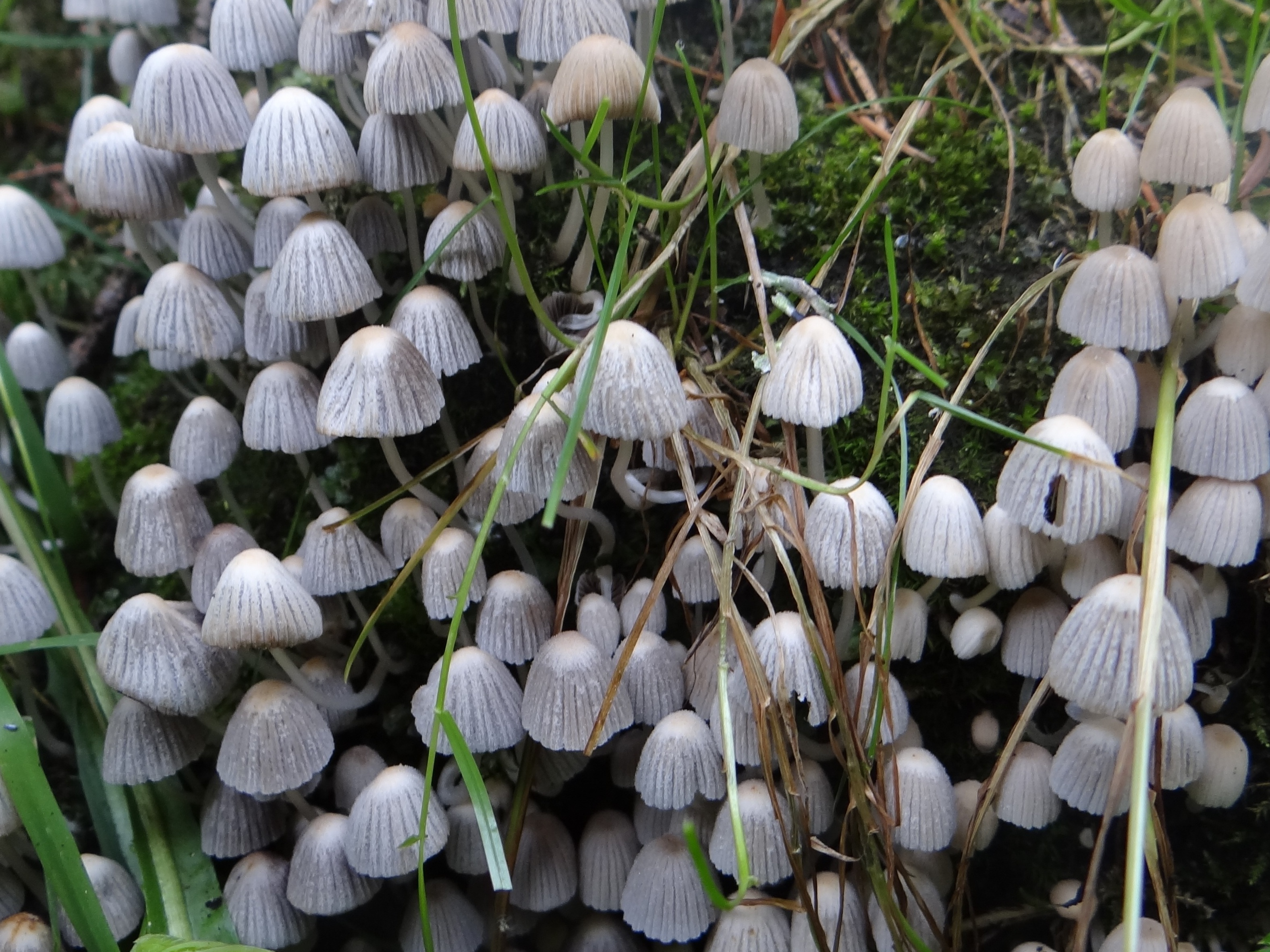
A potential lookalike species is C. disseminatus.

Coprinellus disseminatus resembles Tulosesus impatiens, but may be distinguished by its slightly larger fruit body, somewhat deliquescent gills, and tendency to fruit in smaller groups on the ground, rather than on or around rotting wood. Also, C. disseminatus has smaller spores than T. impatiens, typically 6.6–9.7 by 4.1–5.8 μm. Tulosesus eurysporus is similar to C. disseminatus but usually grows in groups on fallen branches, and has broader spores that measure 8.3–10.3 by 6.7–8.4 μm. T. hiascens usually grows in small dense clumps, has narrower spores (typically 9–11 by 4.5–5.5 μm, and produces smaller fruit bodies.

== Habitat and distribution ==
Tulosesus impatiens is found in North America and Europe (including Germany, Poland, and Ukraine) including northern Turkey. In the Pacific Northwest region of the United States, it is found in Oregon and Idaho. Fruit bodies grow solitarily, or rarely in small bundles, on forest litter in deciduous forests, especially ones dominated by beech.
