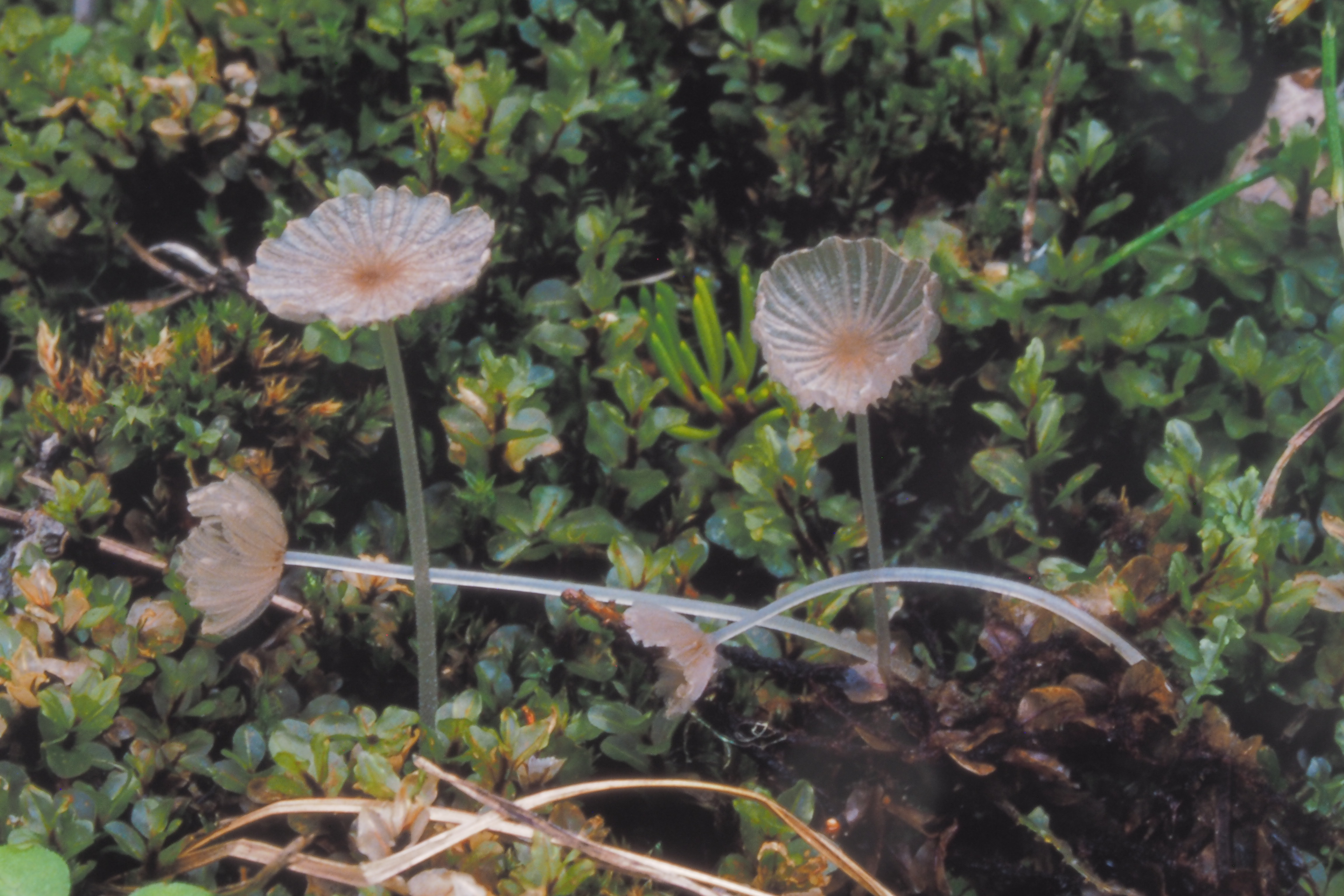

Scientific classification
- Kingdom: Fungi
- Division: Basidiomycota
- Class: Agaricomycetes
- Order: Agaricales
- Family: Psathyrellaceae
- Genus: Tulosesus
- Species: T. amphithallus

Binomial name
- Tulosesus amphithallus (A.H. Sm. & M. Lange) D. Wächt & A. Melzer (2020)

Synonyms
- Coprinus amphithallus M. Lange & A.H. Sm. (1953); Coprinellus amphithallus Redhead, Vilgalys, Moncalvo (2001)

= Tulosesus amphithallus =

Species of fungus

Tulosesus amphithallus is a species of mushroom producing fungus in the family Psathyrellaceae.

== Taxonomy ==
It was first described by mycologists Morten Lange and Alexander H. Smith in 1953 and classified as Coprinus amphithallus.

In 2001 a phylogenetic study resulted in a major reorganization and reshuffling of that genus and this species was transferred to Coprinellus.

The species was known as Coprinellus amphithallus until 2020 when the German mycologists Dieter Wächter & Andreas Melzer reclassified many species in the Psathyrellaceae family based on phylogenetic analysis.

== Description ==
The cap is 0.6 to 1.2 cm (0.24 to 0.47 in) tall, and initially sharply conical in shape, but later expands to become bell-shaped (campanulate). The margin of the cap curves upwards as the mushroom ages. The gills are narrow, and spaced close together. They have an adnate attachment to the stipe, and become black in color before dissolving (deliquescing). The stipe is 3 to 5 cm (1.2 to 2.0 in) by 0.08 to 0.1 cm (0.03 to 0.04 in) thick, hyaline to whitish. Initially it is pruinose (with a very fine whitish powder), but later becomes smooth.

The spores are cylindrical and tapering (terete), and tend to vary in size, with dimensions ranging from 11.2 to 15.6 by 6.2–8.3 μm. The spore-bearing cells, the basidia, are all 2-spored.

== Habitat and distribution ==
This fungus was discovered growing in rich, moist soil. It is known from Denmark and the USA.
