= Tulosesus sassii =

Scientific classification
- Kingdom: Fungi
- Division: Basidiomycota
- Class: Agaricomycetes
- Order: Agaricales
- Family: Psathyrellaceae
- Genus: Tulosesus
- Species: T. sassii

Binomial name
- Tulosesus sassii (M. Lange & A.H. Sm.) D. Wächt & A. Melzer (2020)

Synonyms
- Coprinellus sassii Redhead, Vilgalys & Moncalvo (2001); Coprinus ephemerus f. bisporus J.E. Sass (1929); Coprinus sassii M. Lange & A.H. Sm. (1953)

Species of fungus

Tulosesus sassii is a species of mushroom producing fungus in the family Psathyrellaceae.

== Taxonomy ==
It was first described by mycologists Morten Lange and Alexander H. Smith as Coprinus sassii in 1952.

In 2001 a phylogenetic study resulted in a major reorganization and reshuffling of that genus and this species was transferred to Coprinellus.

The species was known as Coprinellus sassii until 2020 when the German mycologists Dieter Wächter & Andreas Melzer reclassified many species in the Psathyrellaceae family based on phylogenetic analysis.
