= Tulosesus subdisseminatus =

Scientific classification
- Domain: Eukaryota
- Kingdom: Fungi
- Division: Basidiomycota
- Class: Agaricomycetes
- Order: Agaricales
- Family: Psathyrellaceae
- Genus: Tulosesus
- Species: T. subdisseminatus

Binomial name
- Tulosesus subdisseminatus (M. Lange) D. Wächt & A. Melzer (2020)

Synonyms
- Coprinus subdisseminatus M. Lange (1953); Pseudocoprinus subdisseminatus McKnight & P. Allison (1970); Coprinellus subdisseminatus Redhead, Vilgalys & Moncalvo (2001); Coprinus subdisseminatus var. griseifulvus Bogart (1975)

Species of fungus

Tulosesus subdisseminatus is a species of mushroom producing fungus in the family Psathyrellaceae.

== Taxonomy ==
It was first described as Coprinus subdisseminatus by the mycologists Morten Lange and Alexander H. Smith in 1952.

In 2001 a phylogenetic study resulted in a major reorganization and reshuffling of that genus and this species was transferred to Coprinellus.

The species was known as Coprinellus subdisseminatus until 2020 when the German mycologists Dieter Wächter & Andreas Melzer reclassified many species in the Psathyrellaceae family based on phylogenetic analysis.
