= Tulosesus marculentus =

Scientific classification
- Domain: Eukaryota
- Kingdom: Fungi
- Division: Basidiomycota
- Class: Agaricomycetes
- Order: Agaricales
- Family: Psathyrellaceae
- Genus: Tulosesus
- Species: T. marculentus

Binomial name
- Tulosesus marculentus (Britzelm.) D. Wächt & A. Melzer (2020)

Synonyms
- Coprinus marculentus Britzelm. (1893); Coprinellus marculentus Redhead, Vilgalys & Moncalvo (2001); Coprinus hexagonosporus Joss. (1948); Coprinus hexagonosporus var. stephanosporus Joss. (1948); Coprinus hexagonosporus var. homosetulosus Malençon (1970); Coprinus marculentus var. homosetulosus Joss. ex Enderle (1986); Coprinus marculentus f. stephanosporus Joss. (1986)

Species of fungus

Tulosesus marculentus is a species of mushroom producing fungus in the family Psathyrellaceae.

== Taxonomy ==
It was first described as Coprinus marculentus by the German mycologist Max Britzelmayr in 1893.

In 2001 a phylogenetic study resulted in a major reorganization and reshuffling of that genus and this species was transferred to Coprinellus.

The species was known as Coprinellus marculentus until 2020 when the German mycologists Dieter Wächter & Andreas Melzer reclassified many species in the Psathyrellaceae family based on phylogenetic analysis.
