= Tulosesus subpurpureus =

Scientific classification
- Domain: Eukaryota
- Kingdom: Fungi
- Division: Basidiomycota
- Class: Agaricomycetes
- Order: Agaricales
- Family: Psathyrellaceae
- Genus: Tulosesus
- Species: T. subpurpureus

Binomial name
- Tulosesus subpurpureus (A.H. Sm.) D. Wächt & A. Melzer (2020)

Synonyms
- Coprinus subpurpureus A.H. Sm. (1948); Coprinellus subpurpureus Redhead, Vilgalys & Moncalvo (2001)

Species of fungus

Tulosesus subpurpureus is a species of mushroom producing fungus in the family Psathyrellaceae.

== Taxonomy ==
The species was originally found in 1948 in Cheboygan County, Michigan, USA, and described by mycologist Alexander H. Smith, who named it Coprinus subpurpureus.

In 2001 a phylogenetic study resulted in a major reorganization and reshuffling of that genus and this species was transferred to Coprinellus.

The species was known as Coprinellus subpurpureus until 2020 when the German mycologists Dieter Wächter & Andreas Melzer reclassified many species in the Psathyrellaceae family based on phylogenetic analysis.

== Description ==
The cap is 1.5 cm (0.6 in) tall, and up to 3.5 cm (1.4 in) when fully expanded. The cap surface when young has a powdery bloom (pruinose), but becomes smooth (glabrous) in maturity; it is typically brownish in color, but in maturity is colored more purple near the center, and is dark gray to black near the edges. The flesh is thin and fragile, with no discernible odor or taste. The gills have an adnate attachment to the stem, and are narrow and placed closely together; they are buff in color before darkening to black in maturity prior to dissolving (deliquescing). The stipe is 4 to 10 cm (1.6 to 3.9 in) tall by 0.1 to 0.25 cm (0.04 to 0.10 in) thick.

The spores are smooth, elliptical or roughly oval depending on the direction in which they are viewed, and have dimensions of 12–14 by 5.5–6.8 by 7–8 μm. The basidia are 4-spored, and 18–30 by 6–7 μm.

== Habitat ==
Coprinellus subpurpureus was found growing on wet leaves under hardwood trees in Michigan, USA.
