= Tulosesus callinus =

Scientific classification
- Kingdom: Fungi
- Division: Basidiomycota
- Class: Agaricomycetes
- Order: Agaricales
- Family: Psathyrellaceae
- Genus: Tulosesus
- Species: T. callinus

Binomial name
- Tulosesus callinus (M. Lange & A.H. Sm.) D. Wächt & A. Melzer (2020)

Synonyms
- Coprinus callinus M. Lange & A.H. Sm. (1953); Coprinellus callinus Vilgalys, Hopple & Jacq. Johnson (2001)

Species of fungus

Tulosesus callinus is a species of mushroom producing fungus in the family Psathyrellaceae.

== Taxonomy ==
It was first described as Coprinus callinus by mycologists Morten Lange and Alexander H. Smith in 1952.

In 2001 a phylogenetic study resulted in a major reorganization and reshuffling of that genus and this species was transferred to Coprinellus.

The species was known as Coprinellus callinus until 2020 when the German mycologists Dieter Wächter & Andreas Melzer reclassified many species in the Psathyrellaceae family based on phylogenetic analysis.
