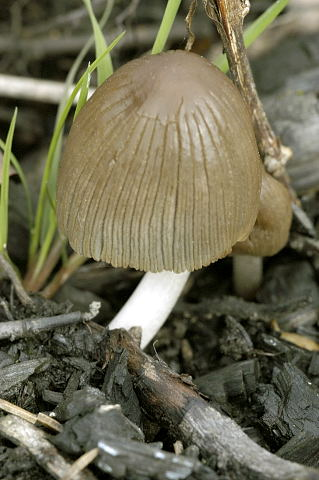

Scientific classification
- Domain: Eukaryota
- Kingdom: Fungi
- Division: Basidiomycota
- Class: Agaricomycetes
- Order: Agaricales
- Family: Psathyrellaceae
- Genus: Tulosesus
- Species: T. angulatus

Binomial name
- Tulosesus angulatus (Peck) D. Wächt & A. Melzer (2020)

Synonyms
- Coprinellus angulatus Redhead, Vilgalys & Moncalvo (2001); Coprinus angulatus Peck (1874); Coprinus boudieri Quél. (1878); Coprinus sociatus var. boudieri Costantin & L.M. Dufour (1891)

= Tulosesus angulatus =

Species of fungus

Tulosesus angulatus is a species of mushroom producing fungus in the family Psathyrellaceae.

== Taxonomy ==
First described by mycologist Charles Horton Peck in 1874 and placed in the genus Coprinus.

In 2001 a phylogenetic study resulted in a major reorganization and reshuffling of that genus and this species was transferred to Coprinellus.

The species was known as Coprinellus angulatus until 2020 when the German mycologists Dieter Wächter & Andreas Melzer reclassified many species in the Psathyrellaceae family based on phylogenetic analysis.
