= Tulosesus mitrinodulisporus =

Scientific classification
- Domain: Eukaryota
- Kingdom: Fungi
- Division: Basidiomycota
- Class: Agaricomycetes
- Order: Agaricales
- Family: Psathyrellaceae
- Genus: Tulosesus
- Species: T. mitrinodulisporus

Binomial name
- Tulosesus mitrinodulisporus (Doveri & Sarrocco) D.Wächt & A.Melzer (2020)

Synonyms
- Coprinellus mitrinodulisporus Doveri & Sarrocco (2011)

Species of mushroom-forming fungus

Tulosesus mitrinodulisporus is a species of dung‑inhabiting agaric fungus in the family Psathyrellaceae, first described in 2011 as a member of genus Coprinellus before being reclassified in 2020. It is characterized by its small, initially ochraceous caps that turn cream and eventually grey with age, and distinctive mitriform (mitre-shaped) spores bearing four knob-like projections. This coprophilous fungus has only been found growing on the dung of alpine chamois (Rupicapra rupicapra) collected at Salati Pass in Aosta, Italy. Its unique combination of habitat preference, granulose veil, and distinctively shaped spores suggests it may occur undetected in similar alpine environments.

== Taxonomy ==
Tulosesus mitrinodulisporus was published by Doveri and Sarrocco as a new species in 2011 based on both morphological and molecular evidence. The holotype specimen was collected 28 August 2008 at Salati Pass (45°52′34″ N, 7°52′05″ E) on the dung of the alpine chamois (Rupicapra rupicapra) and is preserved in the Pisa Botanical Garden herbarium. The specific epithet combines the Latin mitra ("mitre"), nodulus ("small knob") and spora ("spore"), alluding to its mitriform, knobbed basidiospores.

According to the authors, molecular phylogenetic analyses of the nuclear large subunit (LSU) and internal transcribed spacer (ITS) regions, along with a fragment of the β‑tubulin gene, placed this taxon within the genus Coprinellus. After subsequent analysis published in 2020, it was reclassified into Tulosesus following a reorganization of the family Psathyrellaceae.

== Description ==
The cap (pileus) of T. mitrinodulisporus begins subglobose or ellipsoid‑paraboloid when young (up to 2 mm high) then expands through convex‑conic to broadly convex or even revolute, ultimately reaching 3–10 mm diameter. It is densely pruinose‑pubescent at first, becoming radially striate and grooved, and varies from ochreous with orange or purplish tinges to cream, finally greying with age. The gills (lamellae) are ascending, free from the stipe, ventricose and become black as the spores mature, the edges remaining paler. The stipe is slender (up to 45 by 0.5–0.8 mm), hollow, entirely pruinose and often bears a radial mycelial tuft at the base. No distinctive odour is reported.

Microscopically, mature basidiospores measure 9–11.5 by 6–7 by 5–6 μm and are mitriform in frontal view and somewhat almond-shaped (amygdaliform) in side view, typically bearing four knob‑like projections. They are dark reddish‑brown at maturity, possess a prominent eccentric germ pore (1.5–2 μm wide) and are inamyloid. Basidia are four‑spored, 16–27 by 6–9 μm, clavate to more or less cylindrical. Cheilocystidia are abundant, globose to broadly ellipsoidal, 25–39 by 21–32 μm, while pleurocystidia are absent. The pileipellis is a hymeniderm of globose to ellipsoidal cells (20–48 by 16–34 μm) intermingled with two types of pileocystidia: thin‑walled leptocystidia (62–78(–90) by 12–15 μm) and thick‑walled sclerocystidia (35–45 by 11–16 μm), both often encrusted. The veil is composed of sphaerocysts (12–20 μm diam.) that form a coarse, granulose covering on cap and stipe. Clamp connections are absent from the hyphae.

== Habitat and distribution ==
This species is coprophilous, known only from dung of Rupicapra rupicapra collected at Salati Pass in Aosta, Italy, where it fruited in a damp‑chamber culture in late August. To date no additional records exist from the wild, but its unique combination of dung association, granulose veil and mitriform spores suggests it may occur undetected in similar alpine habitat.
