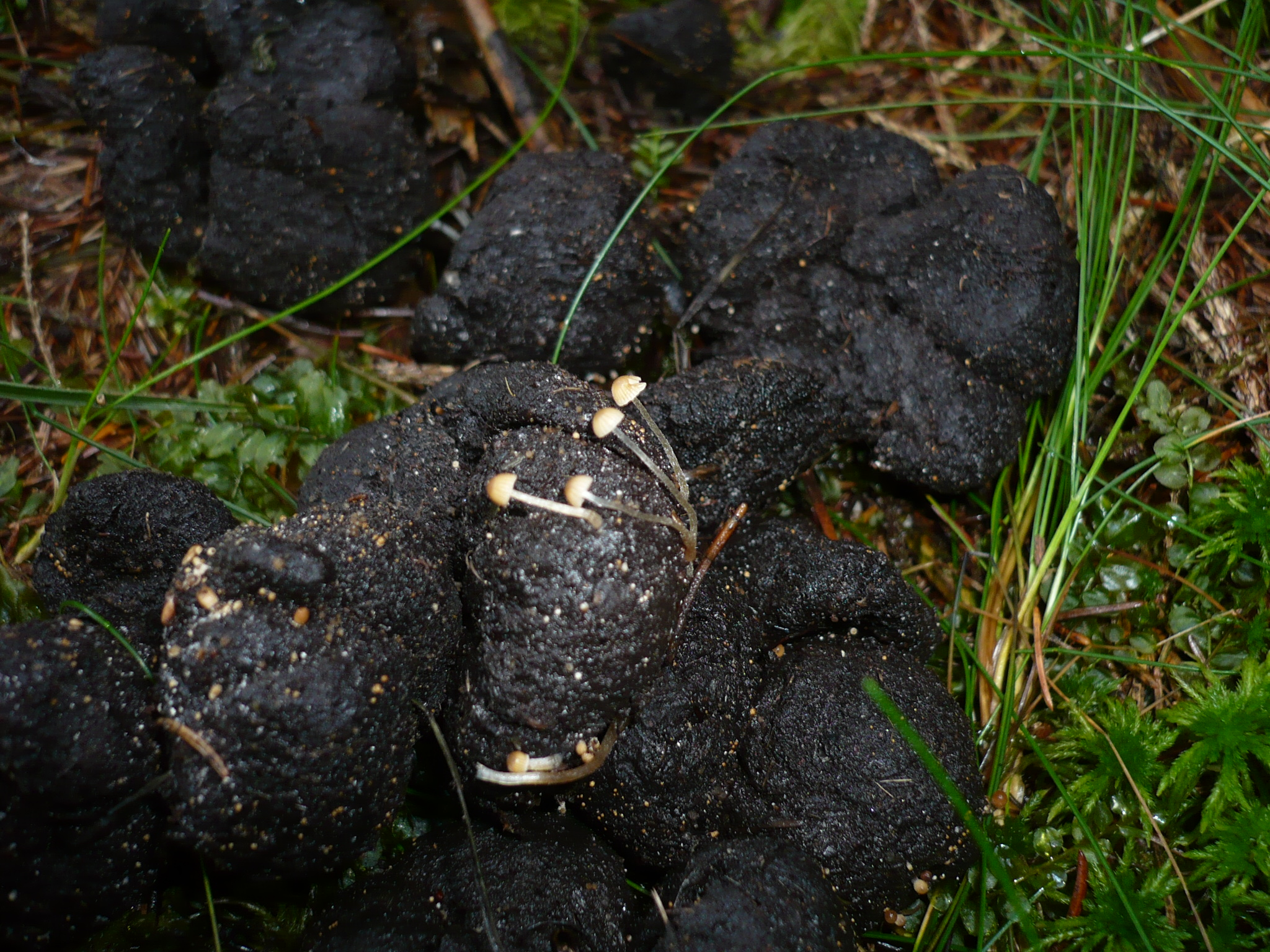

Scientific classification
- Kingdom: Fungi
- Division: Basidiomycota
- Class: Agaricomycetes
- Order: Agaricales
- Family: Psathyrellaceae
- Genus: Tulosesus
- Species: T. pellucidus

Binomial name
- Tulosesus pellucidus (P. Karst.) D. Wächt & A. Melzer (2020)

Synonyms
- Coprinus pellucidus P. Karst. (1883); Coprinellus pellucidus Redhead, Vilgalys & Moncalvo (2001)

= Tulosesus pellucidus =

Species of fungus

Tulosesus pellucidus is a species of mushroom producing fungus in the family Psathyrellaceae.

== Taxonomy ==
It was first described as Coprinus pelliculus by the Finnish mycologist Petter Adolf Karsten in 1882.

In 2001 a phylogenetic study resulted in a major reorganization and reshuffling of that genus and this species was transferred to Coprinellus.

The species was known as Coprinellus pelliculus until 2020 when the German mycologists Dieter Wächter & Andreas Melzer reclassified many species in the Psathyrellaceae family based on phylogenetic analysis.
