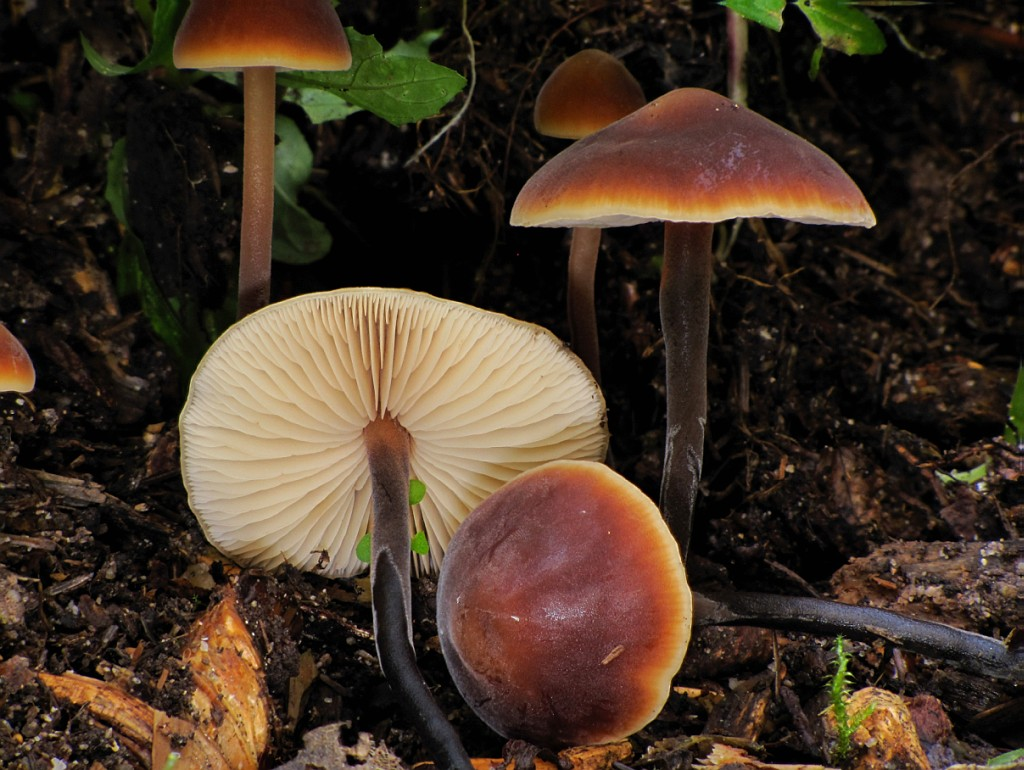
- Macrocystidia cucumis

Scientific classification
- Kingdom: Fungi
- Division: Basidiomycota
- Class: Agaricomycetes
- Order: Agaricales
- Family: Macrocystidiaceae; Kühner
- Genus: Macrocystidia; Joss.

Type species
- Macrocystidia cucumis (Pers.) Joss.

Species
- Macrocystidia africana Macrocystidia cucumis Macrocystidia incarnata Macrocystidia occidentalis Macrocystidia reducta

= Macrocystidia =

Genus of fungi

Macrocystidia is a genus of fungus in the mushroom family Macrocystidiaceae. The genus contains five species that collectively have a widespread distribution.
