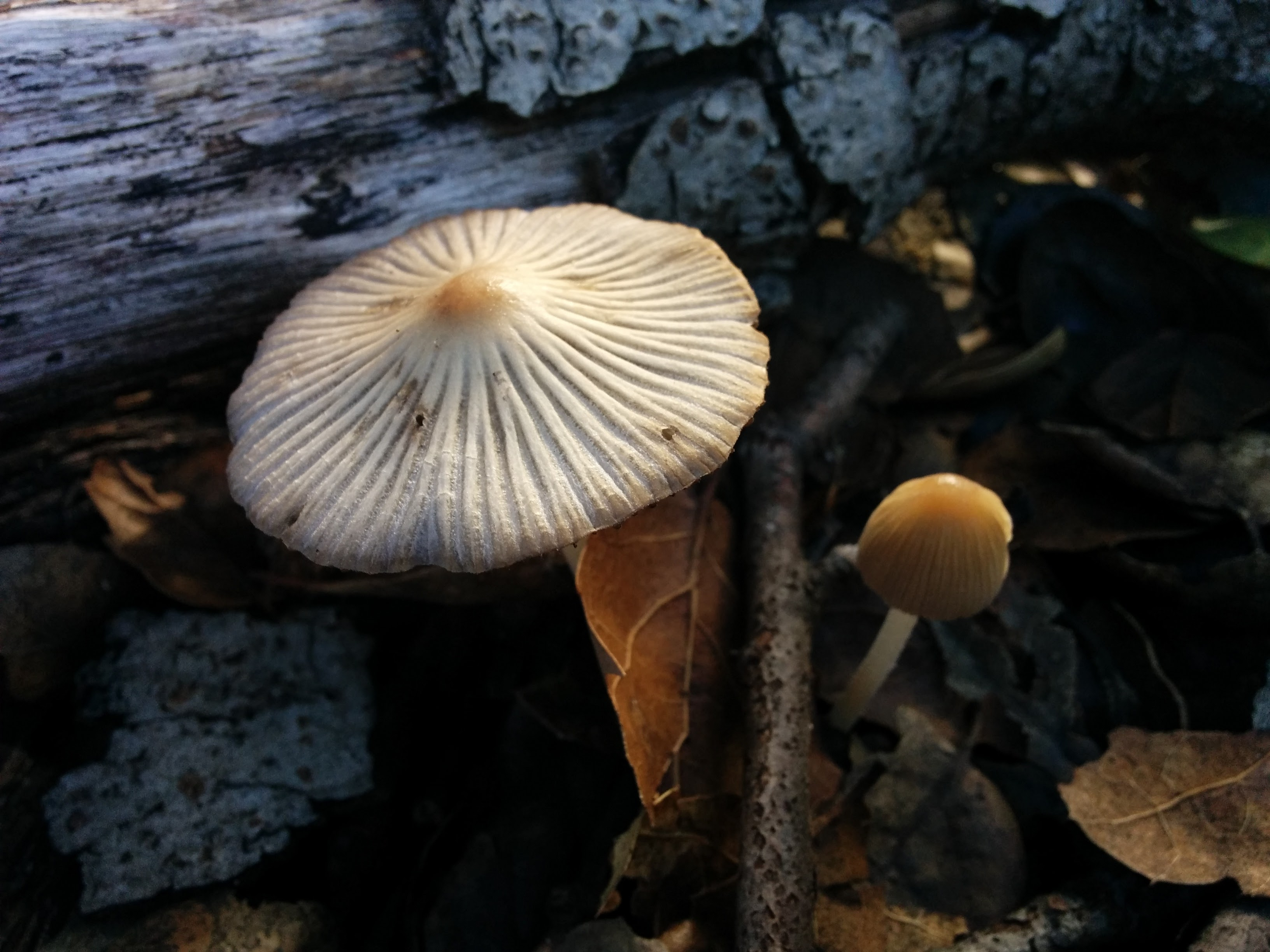
- Tulosesus impatiens

Scientific classification
- Kingdom: Fungi
- Division: Basidiomycota
- Class: Agaricomycetes
- Order: Agaricales
- Family: Psathyrellaceae
- Genus: Tulosesus; D. Wächt & A. Melzer (2020)

Type species
- Tulosesus callinus (M. Lange & A.H. Sm.) D. Wächt & A. Melzer (2020)

= Tulosesus =

Genus of fungi

Tulosesus is a genus of fungi in the family Psathyrellaceae.

== Taxonomy ==
The Tulosesus genus was created in 2020 by the German mycologists Dieter Wächter & Andreas Melzer when the Psathyrellaceae family was subdivided based on phylogenetic analysis. Many members of the Coprinellus genus were reclassified as Tulosesus. The type species, Tulosesus callinus was previously classified as Coprinellus callinus.

== Etymology ==
This genus name is an anagram of setulosus, Latin for having coarse hair or bristles.

== Species ==
As of July 2022, Index Fungorum accepted 39 species of Tulosesus.

1. Tulosesus allovelus
2. Tulosesus amphithallus
3. Tulosesus angulatus
4. Tulosesus aokii
5. Tulosesus bisporiger
6. Tulosesus bisporus
7. Tulosesus brevisetulosus
8. Tulosesus callinus
9. Tulosesus canistri
10. Tulosesus christianopolitanus
11. Tulosesus cinereopallidus
12. Tulosesus cinnamomeotinctus
13. Tulosesus congregatus
14. Tulosesus doverii
15. Tulosesus ephemerus
16. Tulosesus eurysporus
17. Tulosesus fallax
18. Tulosesus fuscocystidiatus
19. Tulosesus heterosetulosus
20. Tulosesus heterothrix
21. Tulosesus hiascens
22. Tulosesus impatiens
23. Tulosesus marculentus
24. Tulosesus minutisporus
25. Tulosesus mitrinodulisporus
26. Tulosesus pallidus
27. Tulosesus pellucidus
28. Tulosesus plagioporus
29. Tulosesus pseudoamphithallus
30. Tulosesus radicellus
31. Tulosesus sabulicola
32. Tulosesus sassii
33. Tulosesus sclerocystidiosus
34. Tulosesus singularis
35. Tulosesus subdisseminatus
36. Tulosesus subimpatiens
37. Tulosesus subpurpureus
38. Tulosesus uljei
39. Tulosesus velatopruinatus

== See also ==
- Coprinellus
