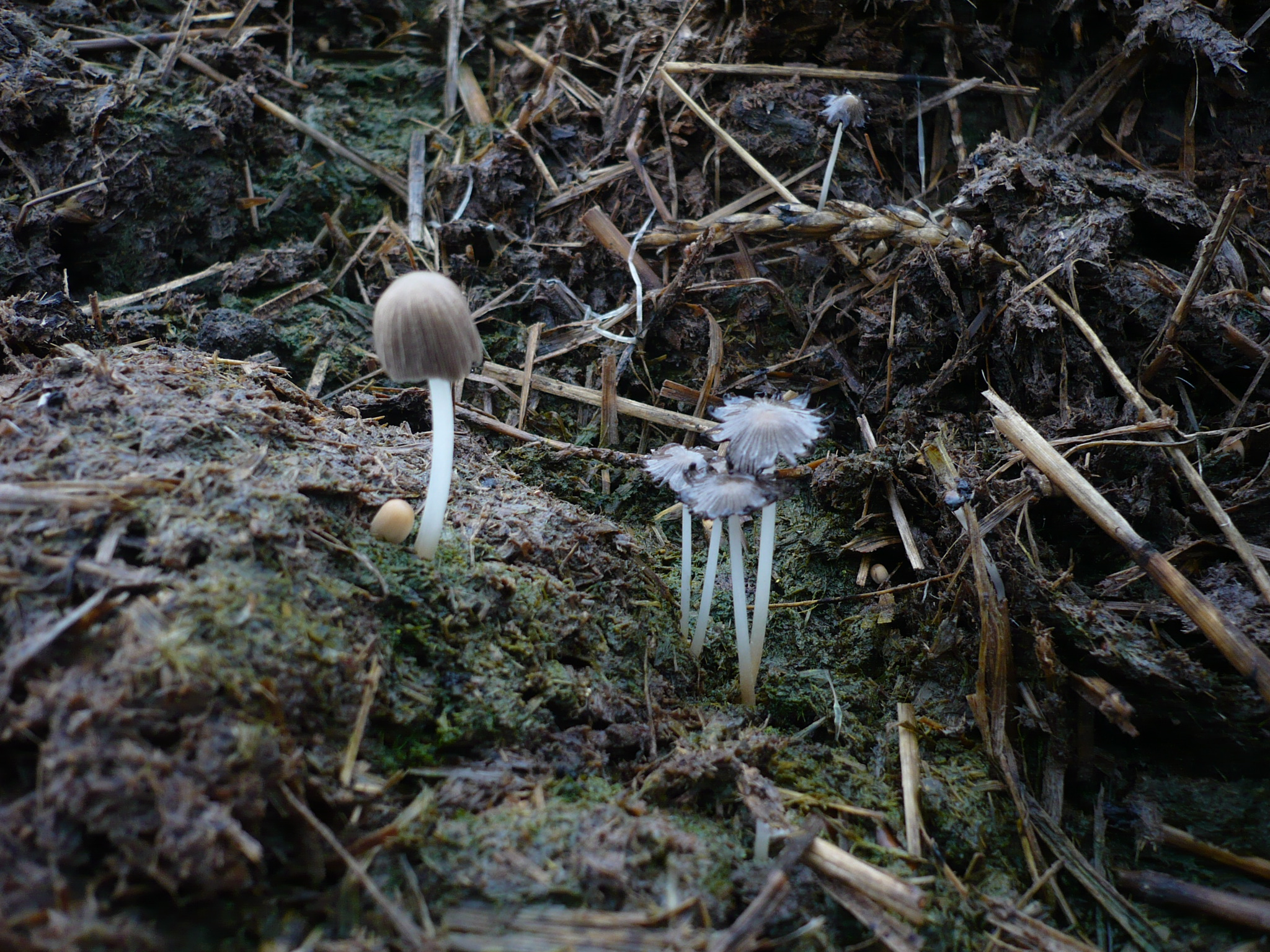

Scientific classification
- Domain: Eukaryota
- Kingdom: Fungi
- Division: Basidiomycota
- Class: Agaricomycetes
- Order: Agaricales
- Family: Psathyrellaceae
- Genus: Tulosesus
- Species: T. bisporiger

Binomial name
- Tulosesus bisporiger (Buller ex P.D.Orton) D. Wächt & A. Melzer (2020)

Synonyms
- Coprinus bisporiger Buller ex P.D.Orton (1976); Coprinellus bisporiger Redhead, Vilgalys, Moncalvo (2001)

= Tulosesus bisporiger =

Species of fungus

Tulosesus bisporiger is a species of mushroom producing fungus in the family Psathyrellaceae.

== Taxonomy ==
It was first described by the English mycologist Peter Darbishire Orton in 1976 and placed in the Coprinus genus.

In 2001, a phylogenetic study resulted in a major reorganization and reshuffling of that genus and this species was transferred to Coprinellus.

The species was known as Coprinellus bisporiger until 2020 when the German mycologists Dieter Wächter & Andreas Melzer reclassified many species in the Psathyrellaceae family based on phylogenetic analysis.
