= Tulosesus velatopruinatus =

Scientific classification
- Domain: Eukaryota
- Kingdom: Fungi
- Division: Basidiomycota
- Class: Agaricomycetes
- Order: Agaricales
- Family: Psathyrellaceae
- Genus: Tulosesus
- Species: T. velatopruinatus

Binomial name
- Tulosesus velatopruinatus (Bender) D. Wächt & A. Melzer (2020)

Synonyms
- Coprinus velatopruinatus Bender(1989); Coprinellus velatopruinatus Redhead, Vilgalys & Moncalvo (2001)

Species of fungus

Tulosesus velatopruinatus is a species of mushroom producing fungus in the family Psathyrellaceae.

== Taxonomy ==
It was first described as Coprinus velatopruinatus by the mycologist Harold Bohn Bender in 1989.

In 2001, a phylogenetic study resulted in a major reorganization and reshuffling of that genus and this species was transferred to Coprinellus.

The species was known as Coprinellus velatopruinatus until 2020 when the German mycologists Dieter Wächter & Andreas Melzer reclassified many species in the Psathyrellaceae family based on phylogenetic analysis.

== Habitat and distribution ==
In 2008, a mycological survey of Clumber Park in Nottinghamshire, England resulted in observations of this species after a heavy summer rain. It is rarely recorded in England.
