= Tulosesus plagioporus =

Scientific classification
- Kingdom: Fungi
- Division: Basidiomycota
- Class: Agaricomycetes
- Order: Agaricales
- Family: Psathyrellaceae
- Genus: Tulosesus
- Species: T. plagioporus

Binomial name
- Tulosesus plagioporus (Romagn) D. Wächt & A. Melzer (2020)

Synonyms
- Coprinus plagioporus Romagn (1941); Coprinellus plagioporus Redhead, Vilgalys & Moncalvo (2001)

Species of fungus

Tulosesus plagioporus is a species of mushroom producing fungus in the family Psathyrellaceae.

== Taxonomy ==
It was first described as Coprinus plagioporus by the mycologist Henri Romagnesi in 1941.

In 2001 a phylogenetic study resulted in a major reorganization and reshuffling of that genus and this species was transferred to Coprinellus.

The species was known as Coprinellus plagioporus until 2020 when the German mycologists Dieter Wächter & Andreas Melzer reclassified many species in the Psathyrellaceae family based on phylogenetic analysis.
