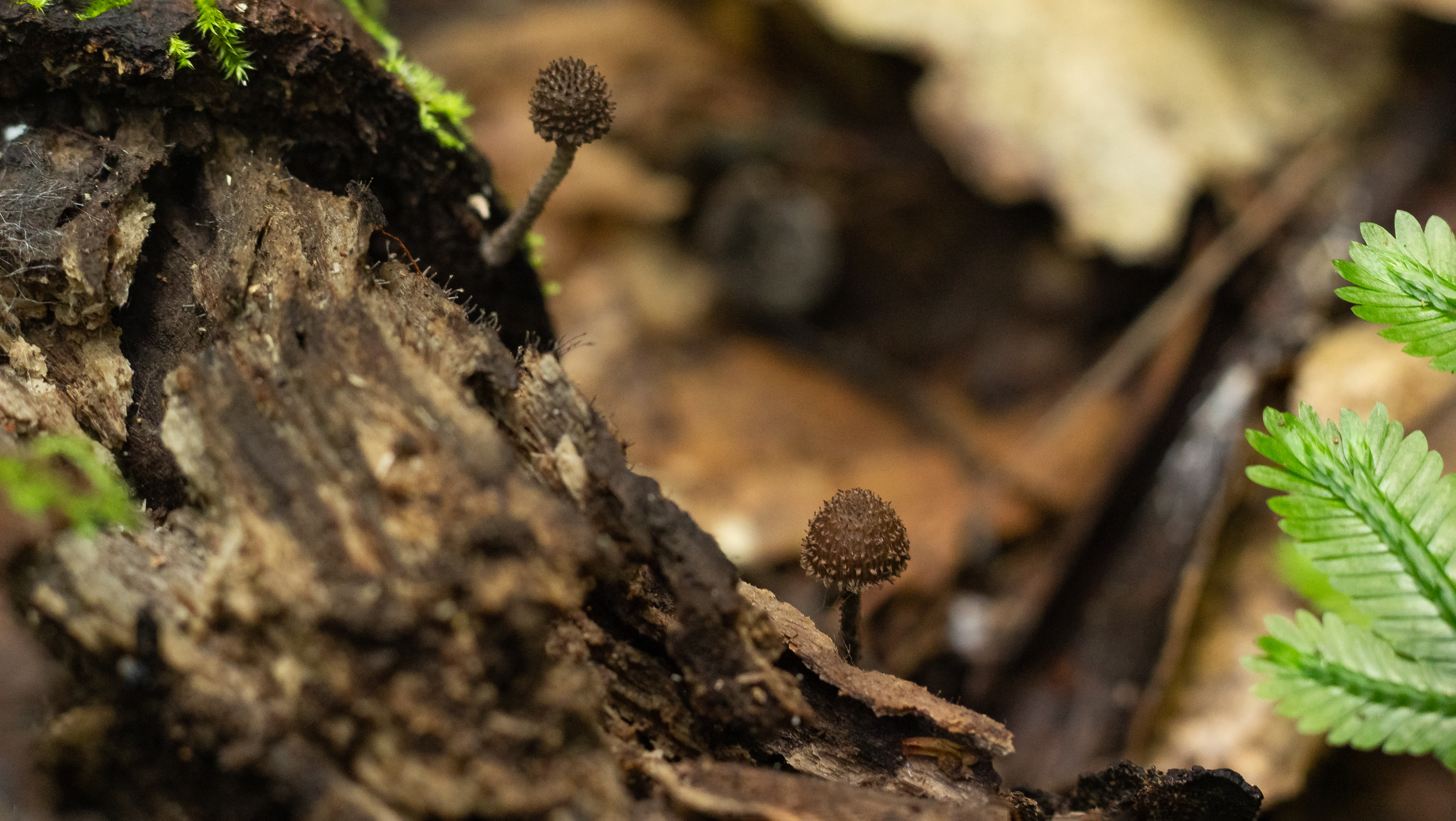

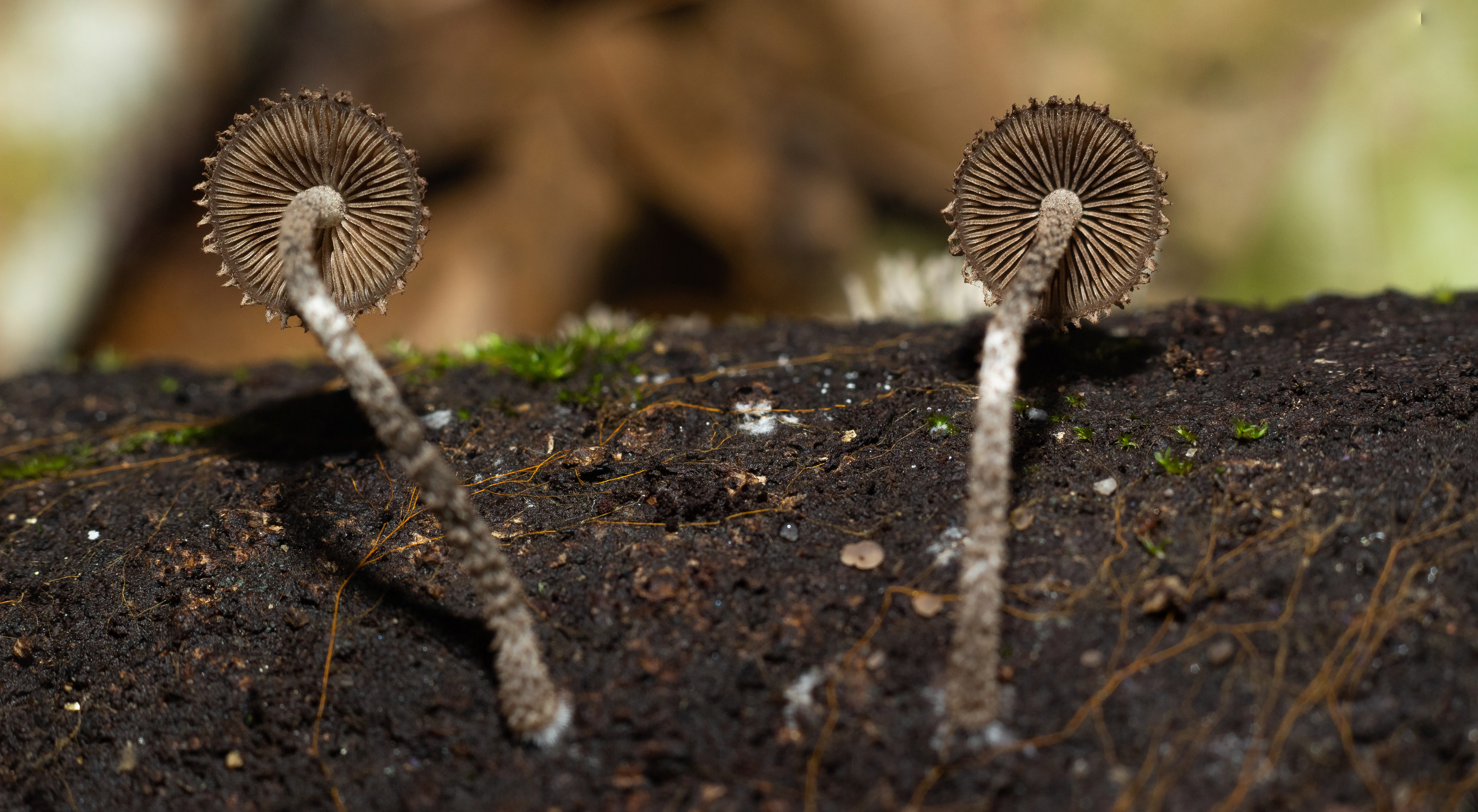

Scientific classification
- Kingdom: Fungi
- Division: Basidiomycota
- Class: Agaricomycetes
- Order: Agaricales
- Family: Psathyrellaceae
- Genus: Cystoagaricus
- Species: C. strobilomyces

Binomial name
- Cystoagaricus strobilomyces (Murrill) Singer (1947)

Synonyms
- Nolanea strobilomyces Murrill (1945))

= Cystoagaricus strobilomyces =

Species of fungus

Cystoagaricus strobilomyces Mycological characteristics
- Gills on hymenium
- Cap is convex or campanulate
- Hymenium is adnate or adnexed
- Stipe is bare
- Spore print is brown
- Ecology is saprotrophic
- Edibility is unknown

Cystoagaricus strobilomyces is a species of mushroom producing fungus in the family Psathyrellaceae and the type species of the Cystoagaricus genus

== Taxonomy ==
It was first described in 1945 by the American mycologist William Murrill who discovered the species in Florida and classified it as Nolanea strobilomyces.

In 1947 the German mycologist Rolf Singer created the new genus Cystoagaricus and placed this species within it.

== Etymology ==
The specific epithet strobilomyces derives from this mushroom's resemblance to members of the Strobilomyces genus as a result of the spiky squamules on the cap.

== Description ==
Cystoagaricus strobilomyces is a small mushroom with grey flesh which possesses distinctive scales or spikes on the cap.

Cap: 4-30mm. Convex, umbonate or campanulate. Grey to brown in colour with squamules (spikes or scales) which contrast the cap. Gills: Start grey discolouring through pale blue and dark brown as it ages. Adnate or adnexed. Stem: 5-40mm tall and 1-3mm in diameter. Grey and covered in scales or woolly tufts. Spore print: Dark brown. Spores: Phaeseoliform (bean shaped), mitriform. 6–7.5 x 5-6 μm.

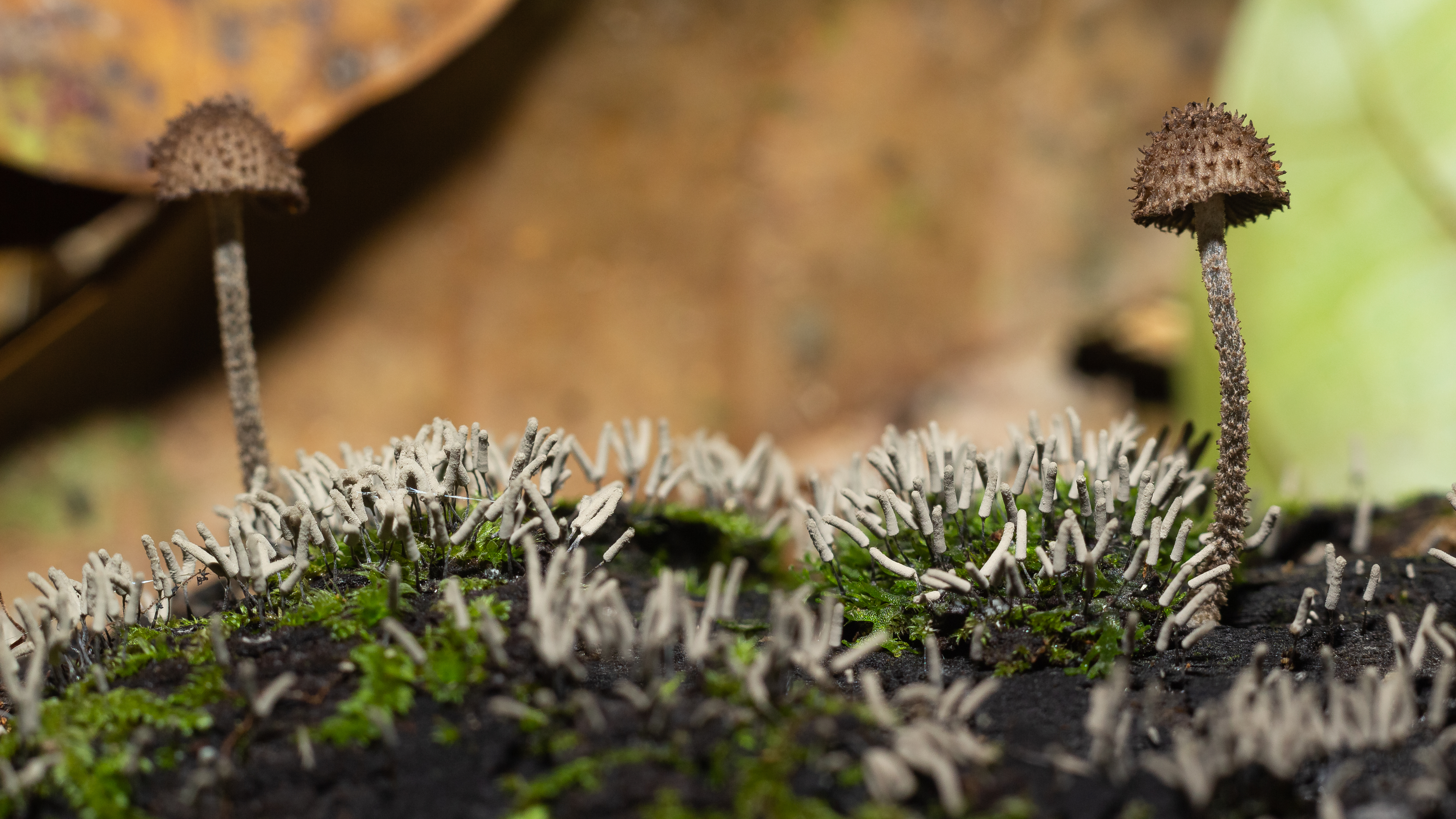
Cystoagaricus strobilomyces mushrooms growing amongst moss and Stemonitis slime mold.
