= Tulosesus hiascens =

Scientific classification
- Domain: Eukaryota
- Kingdom: Fungi
- Division: Basidiomycota
- Class: Agaricomycetes
- Order: Agaricales
- Family: Psathyrellaceae
- Genus: Tulosesus
- Species: T. hiascens

Binomial name
- Tulosesus hiascens (Fr.) D. Wächt & A. Melzer (2020)

Synonyms
- Agaricus hiascens Fr. (1821); Psathyrella hiascens Quél. (1872); Coprinarius hiascens Quél. (1886); Coprinus hiascens J.E.Lange (1938); Coprinellus hiascens Redhead, Vilgalys & Moncalvo (2001)

Species of fungus

Tulosesus hiascens is a species of mushroom producing fungus in the family Psathyrellaceae.

== Taxonomy ==
It was first described as Agaricus hiascens by the Swedish mycologist Elias Magnus Fries in 1821.

In 2001 a phylogenetic study resulted in a major reorganization and reshuffling of that genus and this species was transferred to Coprinellus.

The species was known as Coprinellus hiascens until 2020 when the German mycologists Dieter Wächter & Andreas Melzer reclassified many species in the Psathyrellaceae family based on phylogenetic analysis.
