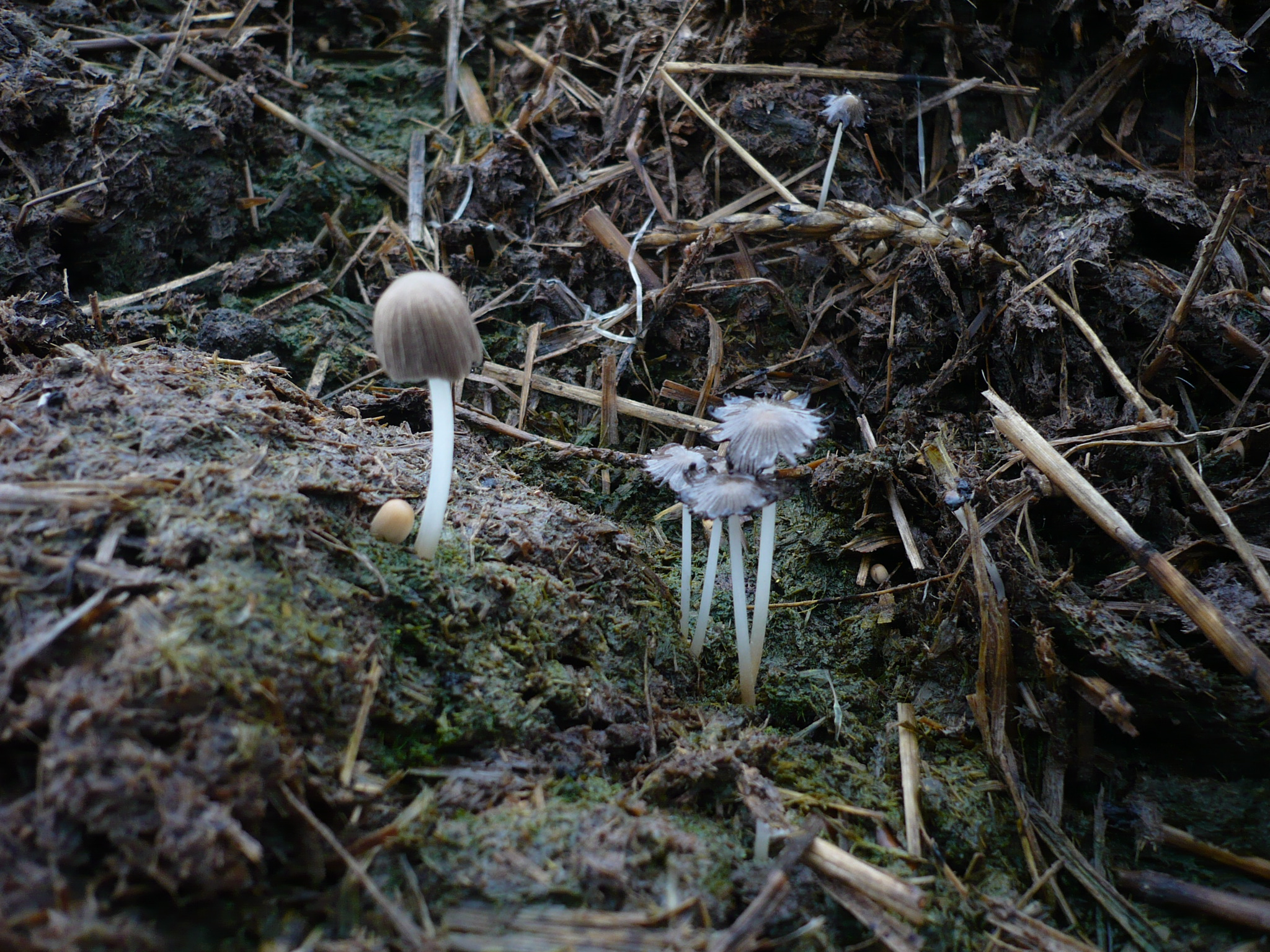

Scientific classification
- Domain: Eukaryota
- Kingdom: Fungi
- Division: Basidiomycota
- Class: Agaricomycetes
- Order: Agaricales
- Family: Psathyrellaceae
- Genus: Tulosesus
- Species: T. bisporus

Binomial name
- Tulosesus bisporus (J.E.Lange) D. Wächt & A. Melzer (2020)

Synonyms
- Coprinus bisporus J.E.Lange (1915); Coprinus ephemerus var. bisporus Konrad & Maubl. (1928); Coprinellus bisporus Vilgalys, Hopple & Jacq. Johnson (2001)

= Tulosesus bisporus =

Species of fungus

Tulosesus bisporus is a species of mushroom producing fungus in the family Psathyrellaceae.

== Taxonomy ==
It was first described as Coprinus bisporus by mycologist Jakob Emanuel Lange in 1915.

In 2001 a phylogenetic study resulted in a major reorganization and reshuffling of that genus and this species was transferred to Coprinellus.

The species was known as Coprinellus bisporus until 2020 when the German mycologists Dieter Wächter & Andreas Melzer reclassified many species in the Psathyrellaceae family based on phylogenetic analysis.
