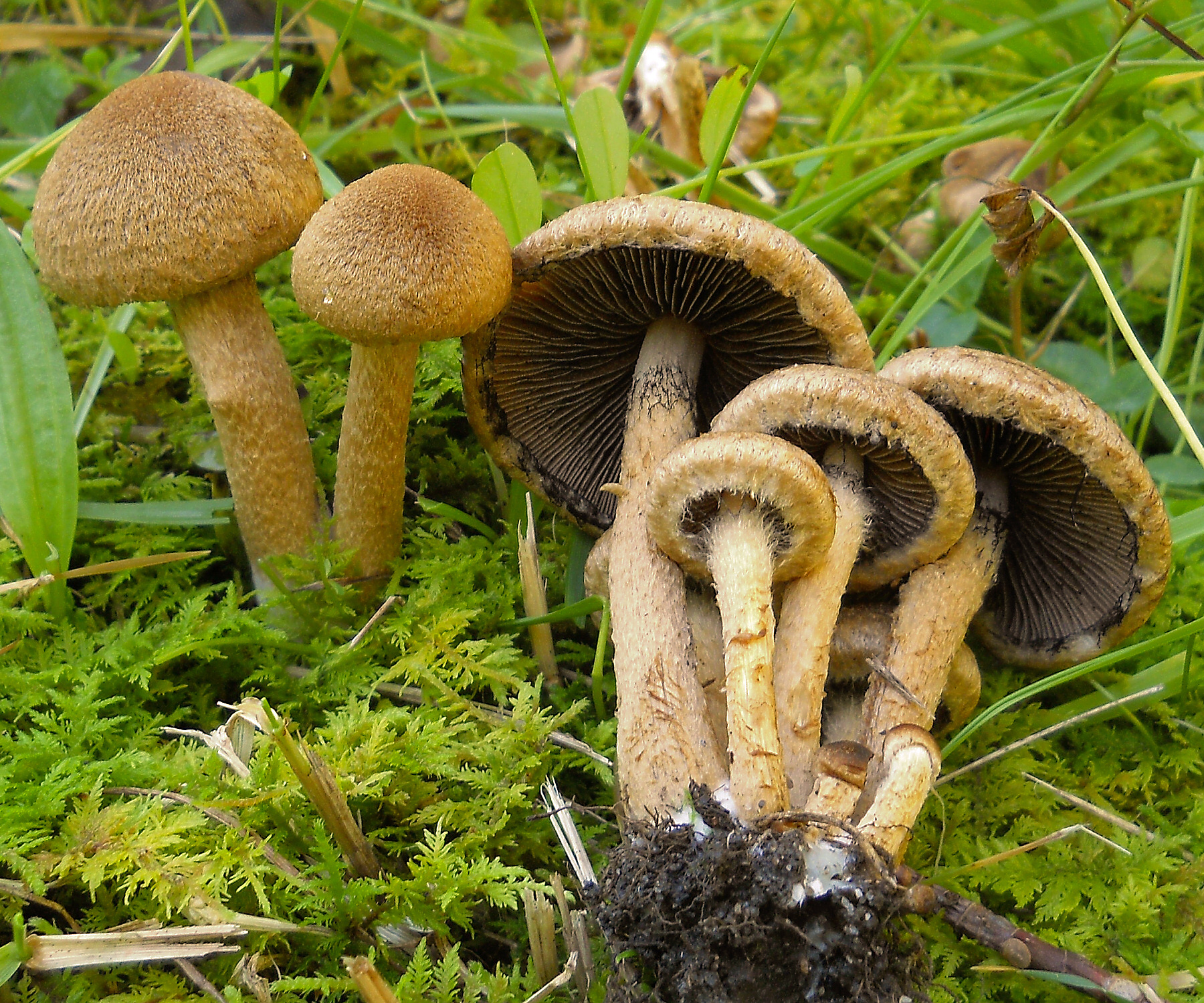

Scientific classification
- Kingdom: Fungi
- Division: Basidiomycota
- Class: Agaricomycetes
- Order: Agaricales
- Family: Psathyrellaceae
- Genus: Lacrymaria
- Species: L. lacrymabunda

Binomial name
- Lacrymaria lacrymabunda (Bull.) Pat. (1887)

Synonyms
- Agaricus lacrymabundus Bull. (1785); Lacrymaria velutina (Pers.) Konrad & Maubl. (1925); Psathyrella velutina (Pers.) Singer (1949)

= Lacrymaria lacrymabunda =

Species of fungus

Lacrymaria lacrymabunda
- Mycological characteristics
- Gills on hymenium
- Cap is campanulate
- Hymenium is adnate
- Stipe is bare
- Spore print is black
- Ecology is saprotrophic
- Edibility is not recommended

Lacrymaria lacrymabunda, commonly known as the weeping widow mushroom, is a species of fungus in the family Psathyrellaceae.

The yellowish to grayish cap is up to 8 centimetres (3 1/4 in) wide, and sometimes orangish in the center. The gills are adnate but may appear adnexed. The stem is up to 13 cm (5 in) long and 1.5 cm (1/2 in) wide. The spore print is blackish-brown.

It is found in North America, Central America, Europe, northern Asia, and New Zealand, where it grows on disturbed ground in woodland, gardens, and parks. Although it is sometimes listed as an edible species, some individuals report developing stomach upset after eating it.
