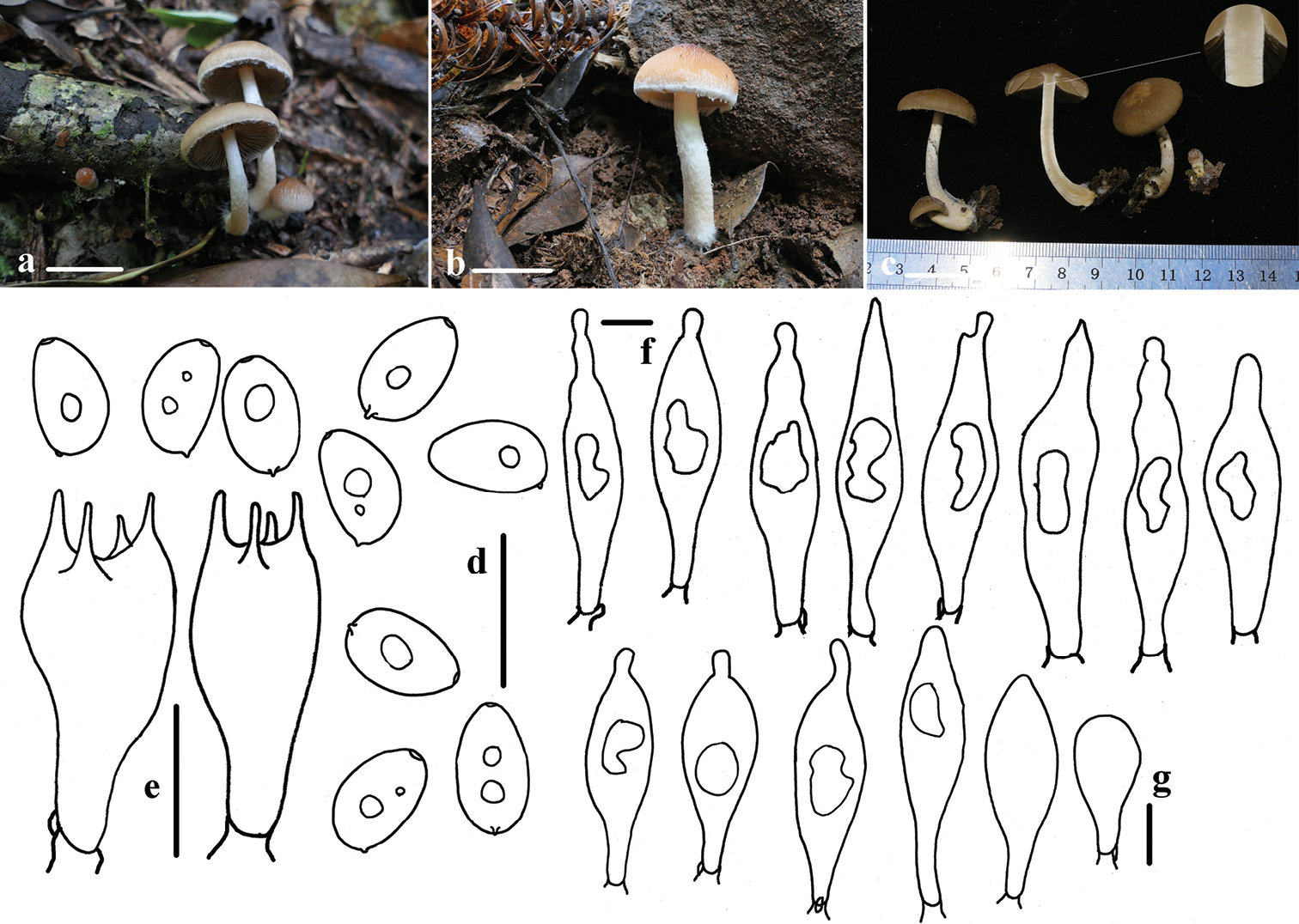
- Illustration of Typhrasa polycystis.

Scientific classification
- Kingdom: Fungi
- Division: Basidiomycota
- Class: Agaricomycetes
- Order: Agaricales
- Family: Psathyrellaceae
- Genus: Typhrasa; Örstadius & E.Larss.

Species
- See text

= Typhrasa =

Genus of fungi

Typhrasa is a genus of mushrooms in the family Psathyrellaceae; it was proposed in 2015 by L. Örstadius and Ellen Larsson.

It contains four species:

- Typhrasa gossypina (Bull.) Örstadius & E.Larss.
- Typhrasa nanispora Örstadius, Hauskn. & E.Larss.
- Typhrasa polycystis J.Q Yan & S.N.Wang, 2021
- Typhrasa rugocephala J.Q Yan & S.N.Wang, 2021

The type species is T. gossypina, which was formerly long known as Psathyrella gossypina. This species was first described as Agaricus gossypinus by Jean Baptiste François Pierre Bulliard in 1789.
