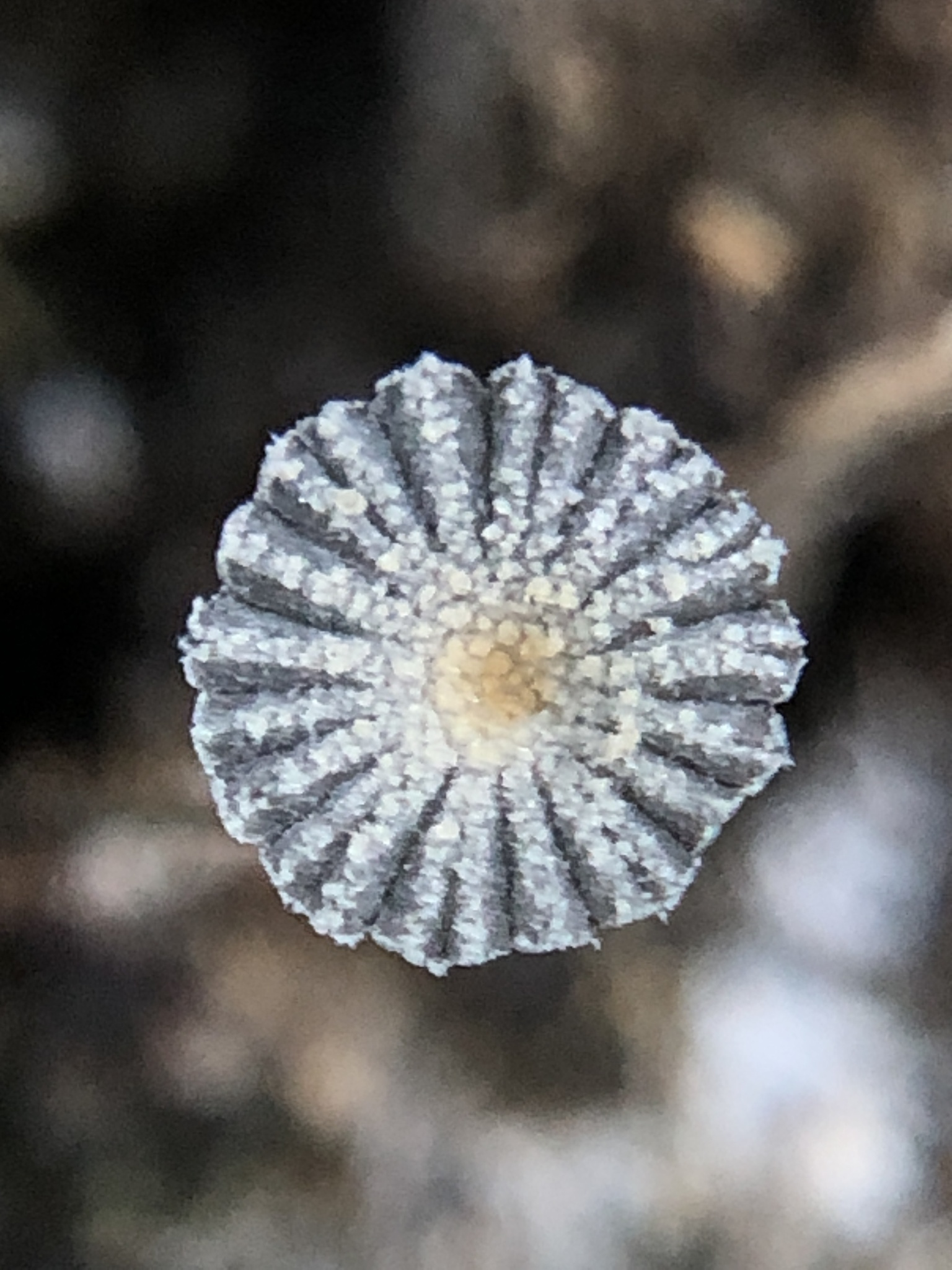
- Narcissea cordispora

Scientific classification
- Kingdom: Fungi
- Division: Basidiomycota
- Class: Agaricomycetes
- Order: Agaricales
- Family: Psathyrellaceae
- Genus: Narcissea; D. Wächt & A. Melzer (2020)

Type species
- Narcissea patouillardii (Quél) D. Wächt & A. Melzer (2020)

= Narcissea =

Genus of fungi

Narcissea is a genus of fungi in the family Psathyrellaceae.

== Taxonomy ==
The Narcissea genus was created in 2020 by the German mycologists Dieter Wächter & Andreas Melzer when the Psathyrellaceae family was subdivided based on phylogenetic analysis. Two members of the Coprinopsis genus were reclassified as Narcissea. A study in 2021 by mycologist Pietro Voto placed a third species, Coprinopsis cardiaspora in this genus.

The type species, Narcissea patouillardii was previously classified as Coprinopsis patouillardii.

== Etymology ==
This genus is named after the French mycologist Narcisse Théophile Patouillard.

== Species ==
As of December 2023 Species Fungorum accepted three species of Narcissea:

- Narcissea cardiaspora
- Narcissea cordispora
- Narcissea patouillardii

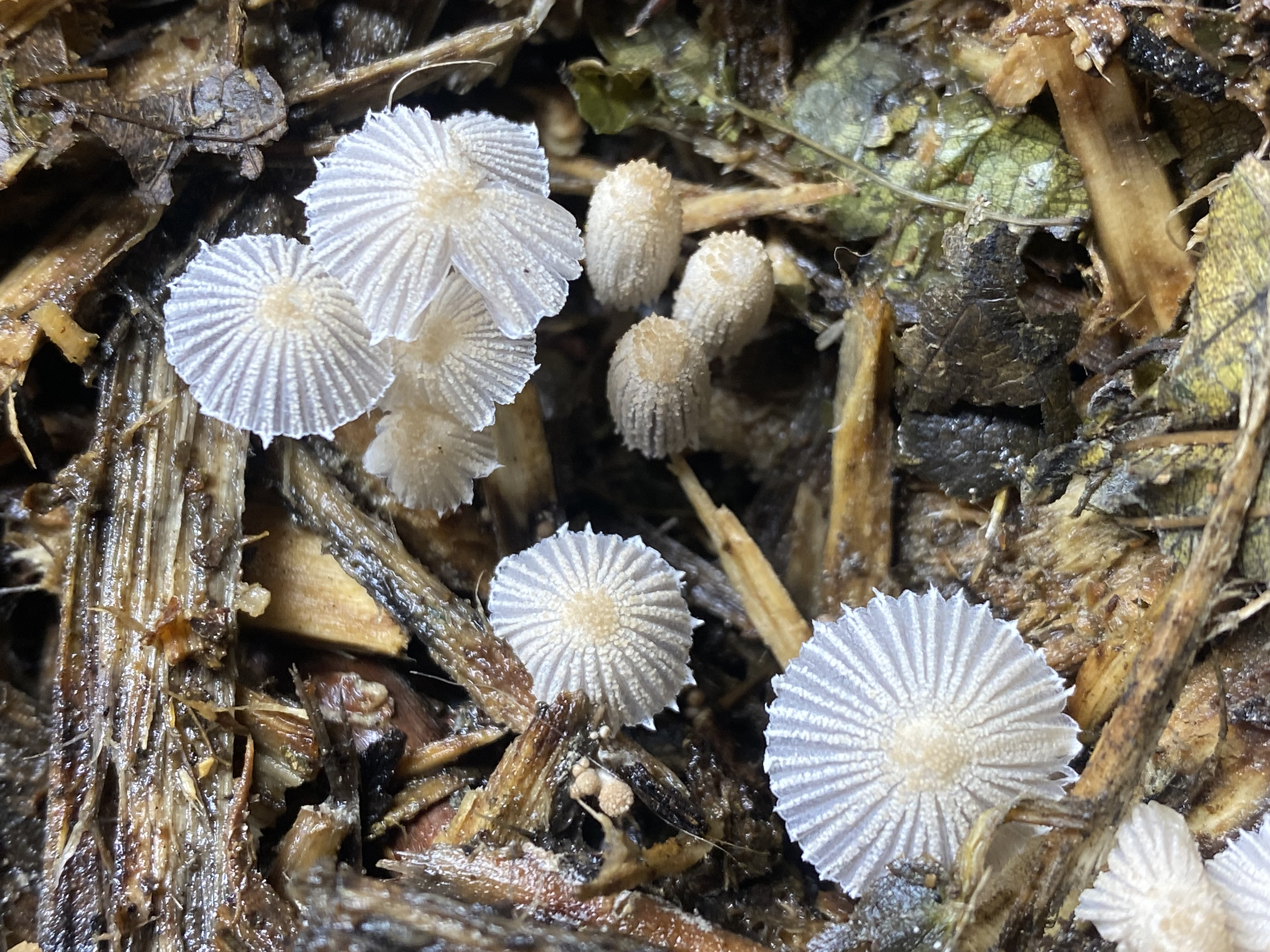
Narcissea cardiaspora
