= Tulosesus heterosetulosus =

Scientific classification
- Domain: Eukaryota
- Kingdom: Fungi
- Division: Basidiomycota
- Class: Agaricomycetes
- Order: Agaricales
- Family: Psathyrellaceae
- Genus: Tulosesus
- Species: T. heterosetulosus

Binomial name
- Tulosesus heterosetulosus (Locq. ex Watling) D. Wächt & A. Melzer (2020)

Synonyms
- Coprinus heterosetulosus Locq. ex Watling (1976); Coprinellus heterosetulosus Vilgalys, Hopple & Jacq. Johnson (2001); Coprinus heterosetulosus Locq. (1947); Coprinus heterosetulosus Locq. (1947); Coprinus heterosetulosus var. leptocystis Bogart (1975); Coprinus heterosetulosus var. excentricus Bogart (1975); Coprinus heterosetulosus var. lavendulicystis Bogart (1975)

Species of fungus

Tulosesus heterosetulosus is a species of mushroom producing fungus in the family Psathyrellaceae.

== Taxonomy ==
It was first classified as Coprinus heterosetulosus by the French mycologist Marcel Locquin in 1947.

In 2001 a phylogenetic study resulted in a major reorganization and reshuffling of that genus and this species was transferred to Coprinellus.

The species was known as Coprinellus heterosetulosus until 2020 when the German mycologists Dieter Wächter & Andreas Melzer reclassified many species in the Psathyrellaceae family based on phylogenetic analysis.

== Description ==
It is a coprophilous fungus, known to grow on the dung of either sheep or goats.
