= Macrometrula =

Scientific classification
- Kingdom: Fungi
- Division: Basidiomycota
- Class: Agaricomycetes
- Order: Agaricales
- Family: Psathyrellaceae
- Genus: Macrometrula; Donk & Singer (1948)

Type species
- Macrometrula rubriceps (Cooke & Massee) Donk & Singer (1948)

Synonyms
- Agaricus rubriceps Cooke & Massee (1887); Chitonia rubriceps (Cooke & Massee) Sacc. (1887); Clarkeinda rubriceps (Cooke & Massee) Kuntze (1891)

Genus of fungi

Macrometrula is a fungal genus in the family Psathyrellaceae. The genus is monotypic, containing the single species Macrometrula rubriceps, found growing in a greenhouse in the Kew Gardens, England. This species was originally named Agaricus rubriceps in 1887.
