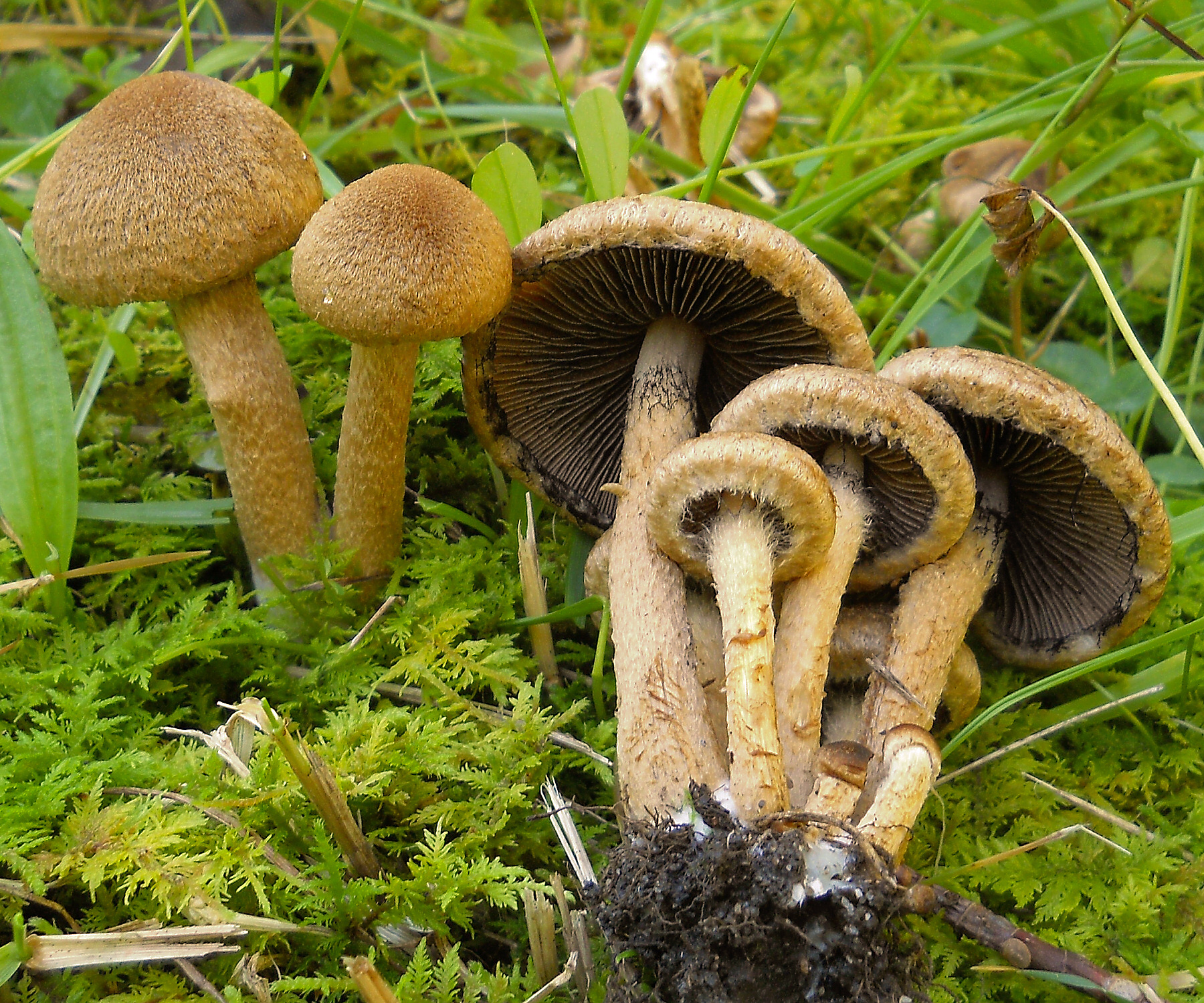
- Lacrymaria lacrymabunda

Scientific classification
- Kingdom: Fungi
- Division: Basidiomycota
- Class: Agaricomycetes
- Order: Agaricales
- Family: Psathyrellaceae
- Genus: Lacrymaria; Pat. (1887)

Type species
- Lacrymaria lacrymabunda (Bull.) Pat. (1887)

Synonyms
- Cortiniopsis J.Schröt. (1889); Glyptospora Fayod (1889)

= Lacrymaria (fungus) =

Genus of fungi

Lacrymaria is a genus of fungi in the family Psathyrellaceae. A 2008 estimate placed 14 species in the widespread genus.

== Species ==
- Lacrymaria asperospora (Cleland) Watling (1979)
- Lacrymaria atricha (Berk.) Kits van Wav. (1995)
- Lacrymaria castanophylla (Berk.) Kits van Wav. (1995)
- Lacrymaria glareosa (J.Favre) Watling (1979)
- Lacrymaria hemisodes (Berk.) Kits van Wav. (1995)
- Lacrymaria hypertropicalis (Guzmán, Bandala & Montoya) Cortez (2005)
- Lacrymaria ignescens (Lasch) S.Lundell & Nannf. (1979)
- Lacrymaria lacrymabunda (Bull.) Pat. (1887)
  - var. olivacea Häffner (1995)
- Lacrymaria phlebophora Pat. (1898)
- Lacrymaria pyrotricha (Holmsk.) Konrad & Maubl. (1925)
- Lacrymaria rigidipes (Peck) Watling (1979)
- Lacrymaria rugocephala (G.F.Atk.) Watling (1979)
- Lacrymaria sepulchralis (Singer, A.H.Sm. & Guzmán) Watling (1979)
- Lacrymaria subcinnamomea (A.H.Sm.) Watling (1979)

== See also ==
- List of Agaricales genera
