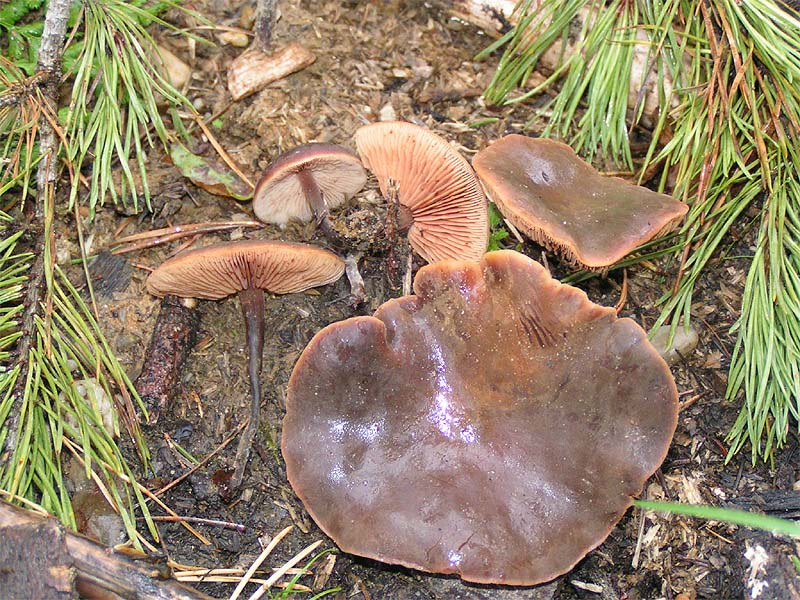

Scientific classification
- Kingdom: Fungi
- Division: Basidiomycota
- Class: Agaricomycetes
- Order: Agaricales
- Family: Macrocystidiaceae
- Genus: Macrocystidia
- Species: M. cucumis

Binomial name
- Macrocystidia cucumis (Pers.) Joss. (1934)

Synonyms
- Agaricus cucumis Pers. (1796)

= Macrocystidia cucumis =

Species of fungus

Macrocystidia cucumis is a common, inedible mushroom of the genus Macrocystidia, often found in large numbers on needle litter or moist soil.

== Description ==
The cap is convex to flat, dark red to blackish brown with a yellowish edge, very much paler when dry and growing up to 5 cm (2 in) in diameter. The gills are white, later reddish and quite crowded. The spores are variable in colour: white, pink, brown have all been observed. The stipe is a similar colour to the cap, thin, and velvety at the base. The flesh is white and has a smell of freshly cut cucumbers.

This mushroom also has large cystidia on the gills, cap, and stipe.

== Distribution and habitat ==
Macrocystidia cucumis was originally described in Europe where it is most common, and it is also known from North America, Australia and New Zealand. It can be found in forests, disturbed grounds and gardens and its preferred substrate is wood debris.
