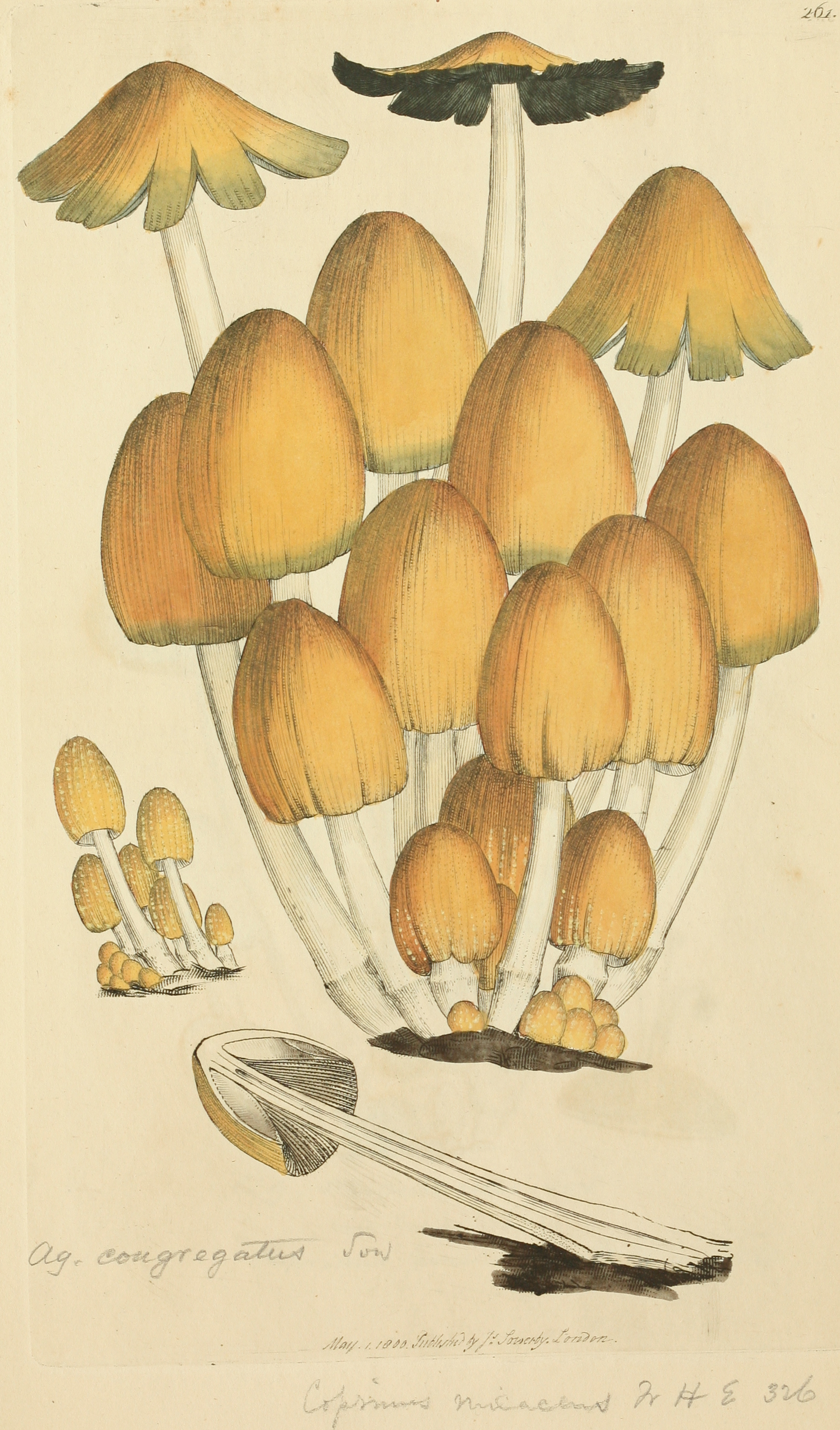

Scientific classification
- Domain: Eukaryota
- Kingdom: Fungi
- Division: Basidiomycota
- Class: Agaricomycetes
- Order: Agaricales
- Family: Psathyrellaceae
- Genus: Tulosesus
- Species: T. congregatus

Binomial name
- Tulosesus congregatus (Bull.) D. Wächt & A. Melzer (2020)

Synonyms
- Agaricus congregatus Bull. (1786); Coprinus congregatus Fr. (1838); Coprinellus congregatus P. Karst. (1879); Agaricus disseminatus Schumach. (1803); Coprinus congregatus var. megasporus Bogart (1975)

= Tulosesus congregatus =

Species of fungus

Tulosesus congregatus is a species of mushroom producing fungus in the family Psathyrellaceae.

== Taxonomy ==
It was first described in 1782 as Agaricus congregatus by French mycologist Jean Baptiste François Pierre Bulliard and later transferred to the genus Coprinellus in 1879 by Finnish mycologist Petter Adolf Karsten. They are found in North America and Europe.

The species was known as Coprinellus congregatus until 2020 when the German mycologists Dieter Wächter & Andreas Melzer reclassified many species in the Psathyrellaceae family based on phylogenetic analysis.
