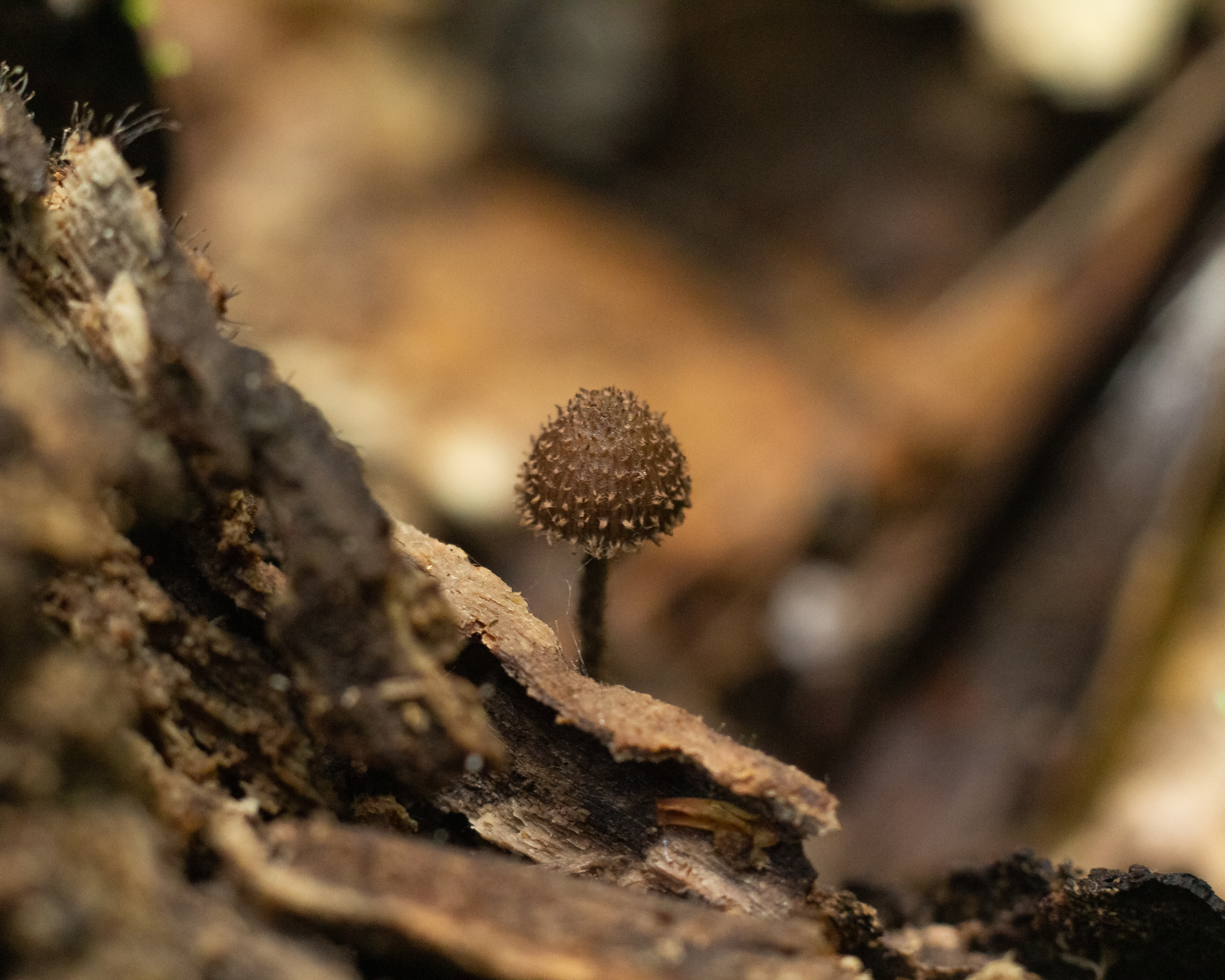
- Cystoagaricus strobilomyces

Scientific classification
- Kingdom: Fungi
- Division: Basidiomycota
- Class: Agaricomycetes
- Order: Agaricales
- Family: Psathyrellaceae
- Genus: Cystoagaricus; Singer (1947)

Type species
- Cystoagaricus strobilomyces (Murrill) Singer (1947)

Species
- C. jujuyensis; C. sachaensis; C. strobilomyces; and see text

= Cystoagaricus =

Genus of fungi

Cystoagaricus is a genus of fungi in the family Psathyrellaceae. The genus contains four species found in subtropical America. The genus was circumscribed by mycologist Rolf Singer in 1947, with Cystoagaricus strobilomyces as the type species.

== Species ==
As of July 2022, Index Fungorum accepted 9 species of Cystoagaricus.

- Cystoagaricus hirtosquamulosus (Peck) Örstadius & E. Larss. (2015); Psathyrellaceae
- Cystoagaricus jujuyensis Singer (1973); Psathyrellaceae
- Cystoagaricus olivaceogriseus (A.H. Sm.) Örstadius & E. Larss. (2015); Psathyrellaceae
- Cystoagaricus propinquus (A.H. Sm.) Voto (2019); Psathyrellaceae
- Cystoagaricus squarrosiceps (Singer) Örstadius & E. Larss. (2015); Psathyrellaceae
- Cystoagaricus strobilomyces (Murrill) Singer (1947); Psathyrellaceae
- Cystoagaricus subamarus (A.H. Sm.) Voto (2019); Psathyrellaceae
- Cystoagaricus sylvestris (Gillet) Örstadius & E. Larss. (2015); Psathyrellaceae
- Cystoagaricus weberi (Murrill) Voto (2019); Psathyrellaceae

Cystoagaricus trisulphuratus is a species complex that is nowadays often placed in genus Agaricus.
