= Hormographiella =

Scientific classification
- Kingdom: Fungi
- Division: Basidiomycota
- Class: Agaricomycetes
- Order: Agaricales
- Family: Psathyrellaceae
- Genus: Hormographiella; Guarro & Gené (1992)

Type species
- Hormographiella aspergillata Guarro, Gené & De Vroey (1992)

Species
- H. aspergillata H. candelabrata H. verticillata

Genus of fungi

Hormographiella is a genus of fungi in the family Psathyrellaceae. The genus contains three species of anamorphic fungi that have Coprinopsis or Coprinellus teleomorphs.
