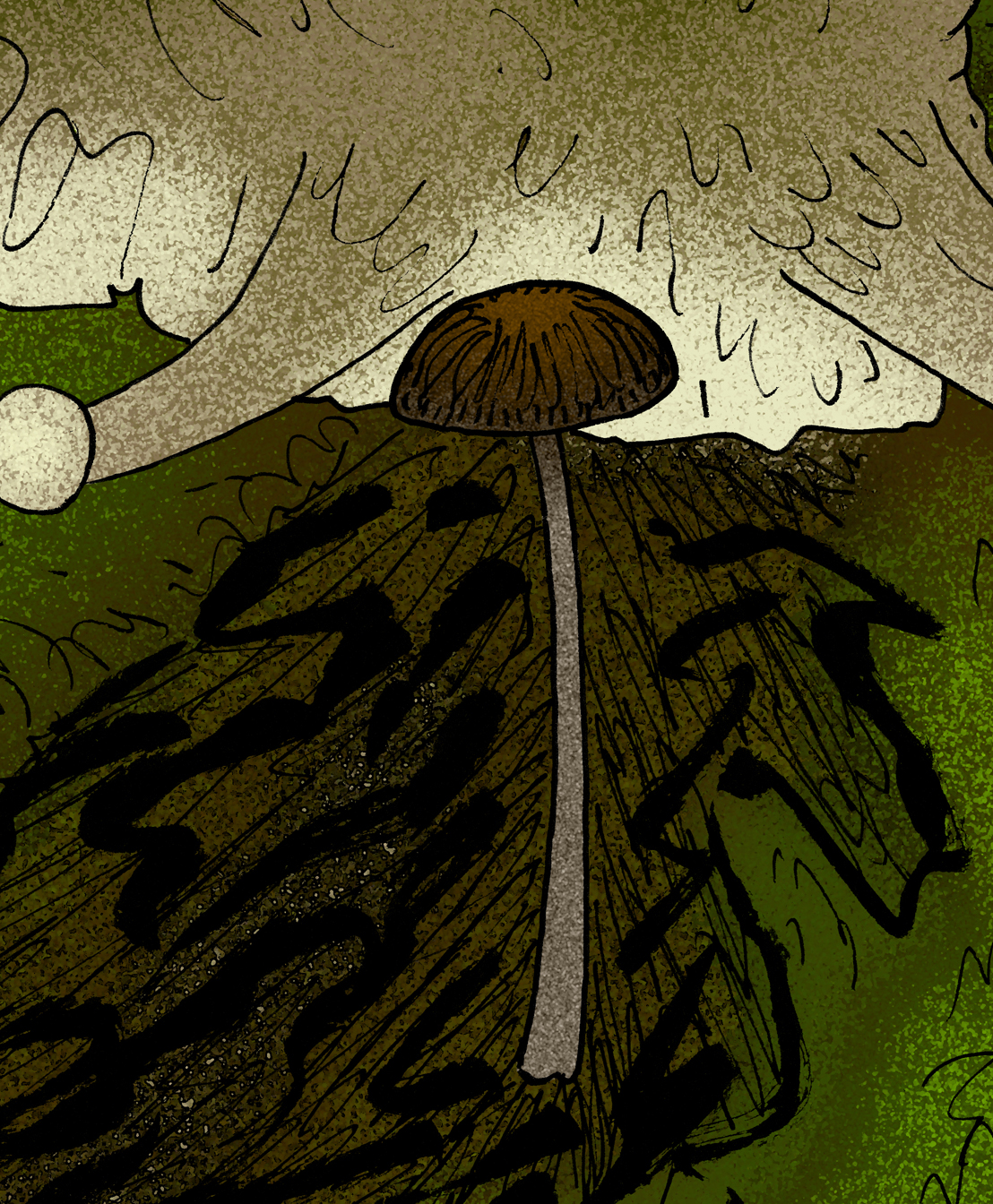
- restoration

Scientific classification
- Kingdom: Fungi
- Division: Basidiomycota
- Class: Agaricomycetes
- Order: Agaricales
- Family: Psathyrellaceae
- Genus: Palaeocybe; Dörfelt & Striebich (2000)

Type species
- Palaeocybe striata Dörfelt & Striebich (2000)

= Palaeocybe =

Genus of extinct mushroom

Palaeocybe is a fungal genus in the family Psathyrellaceae. The genus is monotypic, containing the single fossil species Palaeocybe striata, which was found in Tertiary amber in Saxony, Germany. The holotype consists of a single cap measuring 1.6 mm in diameter, and part of a stem, which is made of tubes. On the cap underside are decurrent gills
