= Marcel Josserand =

French mycologist

- Born: 5 October 1900; Lyon
- Died: 28 March 1992 (aged 91); Lyon
- Known for: Agaricales
- Scientific career
- Fields: Mycology
- Author abbrev. (botany): Joss.

Marcel Josserand (5 October 1900 – 28 March 1992) was a French mycologist.

== Biography ==
Marcel Josserand was born in Lyon in 1900 and died also in Lyon in 1992. He devoted the greater part of his life to the study of fungi, especially those normally described as mushrooms (that is, agarics). In 1923, he co-created the Mycological section of the Linnaean Society of Lyon, of which he was later president at various times. From 1938 he collaborated with the famous mycologist Robert Kühner in Lyon.

His best-known book was "La description des Champignons supérieurs (Basiodiomycètes charnus) - technique descriptive, vocabulaire raisonné du descripteur" {"Description of the higher fungi (fleshy basidiomycetes) - descriptive technique and reasoned vocabulary for the describer"}.

== Relevant species ==
Two examples of fungi for which he was the name author are Macrocystidia cucumis (Pers.) Joss. in 1934 and Lepiota ignivolvata Bousset & Joss. ex Joss. in 1990 following an earlier description in 1948.

Also the following mushrooms were all named after him.

- Cortinarius josserandii Bidaud (1994)
- Dermoloma josserandii Dennis & P.D. Orton (1960)
- Gerronema josserandii Singer (1963)
- Gymnopilus josserandii Antonín (2000)
- Russula josserandii Bertault (1977)
- Strossmayeria josserandii (Grélet) Bertault (1970)
- Tricholoma josserandii Bon (1975)
- Zelleromyces josserandii Malençon (1976)
