= Jakob Emanuel Lange =

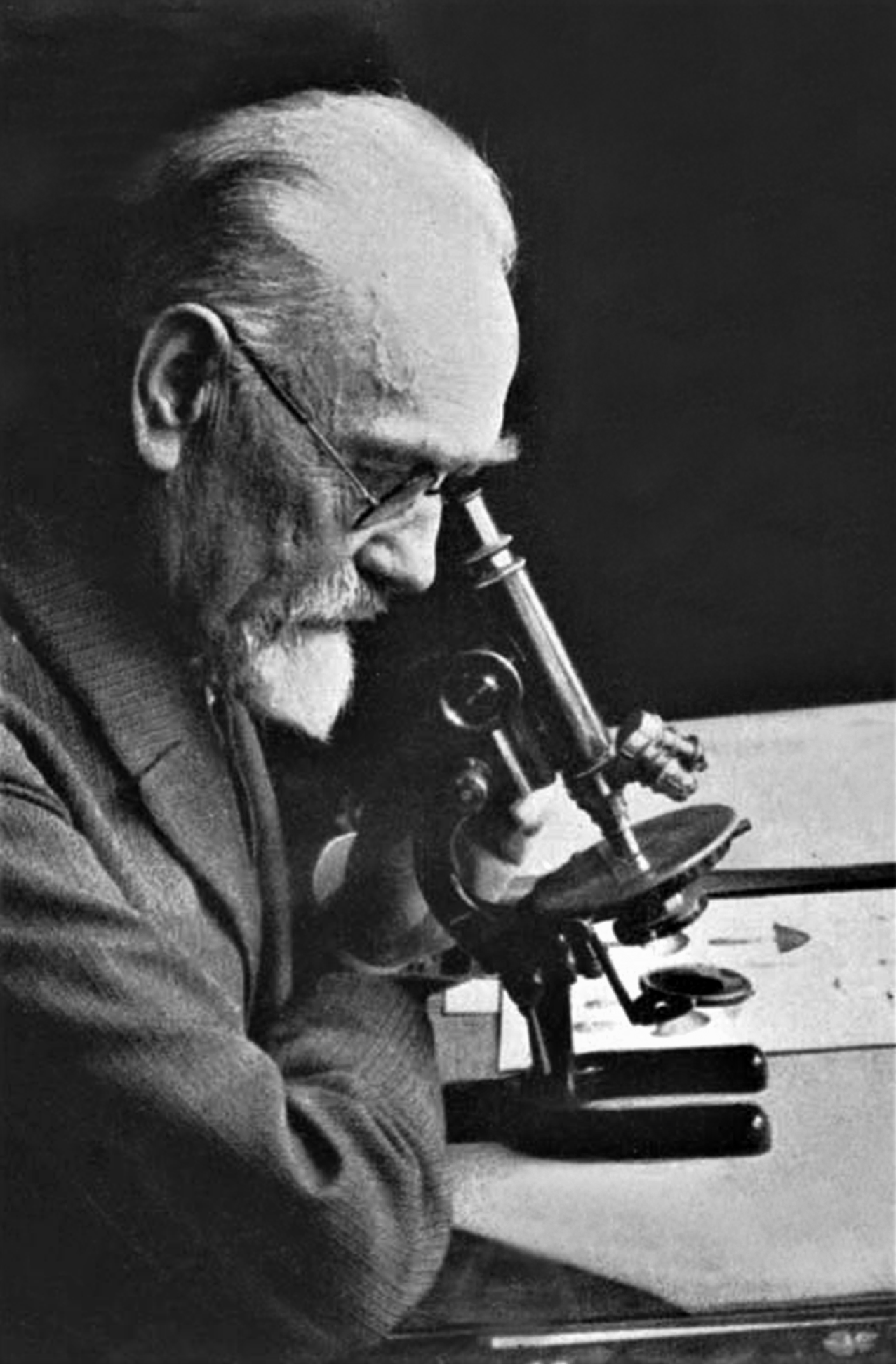
Jakob Emanuel Lange, Danish mycologist (1864–1941)

Jakob Emanuel Lange (2 April 1864 – 27 December 1941), was a Danish mycologist who studied the systematics of gilled mushrooms. His best-known work is Flora Agaricina Danica, a five-volume plate work on the Agaricales of Denmark. He was also a dedicated Georgist land reformer. He translated Progress and poverty to Danish in 1905.

He was the father of Morten Lange (1919–2003), mycologist, professor at the University of Copenhagen and member of the Folketing.
