= Morten Lange =

Danish botanist (1919–2003)

Knud Morten Lange (24 November 1919 – 10 November 2003) was a Danish mycologist and politician.

== Academic career ==
Lange was the son of the mycologist Jakob E. Lange. He was professor of botany at the University of Copenhagen 1958-1989 and university vice chancellor 1976–1979. Early in his career, he established his name in arctic mycology, starting with his first expedition to Greenland in 1946. His studies of mating and intersterility in basidiomycetes are now classical.

Later, Lange's active research career succumbed to the burden of many administrative and political commitments. He nevertheless authored a number of popular mushroom books, which have been translated to several languages.

== Political career ==
Politically, Lange was the first member of the Communist Party of Denmark, but during the 1950s, he got into open conflict with the party executives and co-founded the Socialist People's Party in 1959. He was a member of the parliament (Folketinget) for that party from 1960 to 1976. He was a public proponent of nuclear energy as chairman of the state Energy Council (1976–1987).
