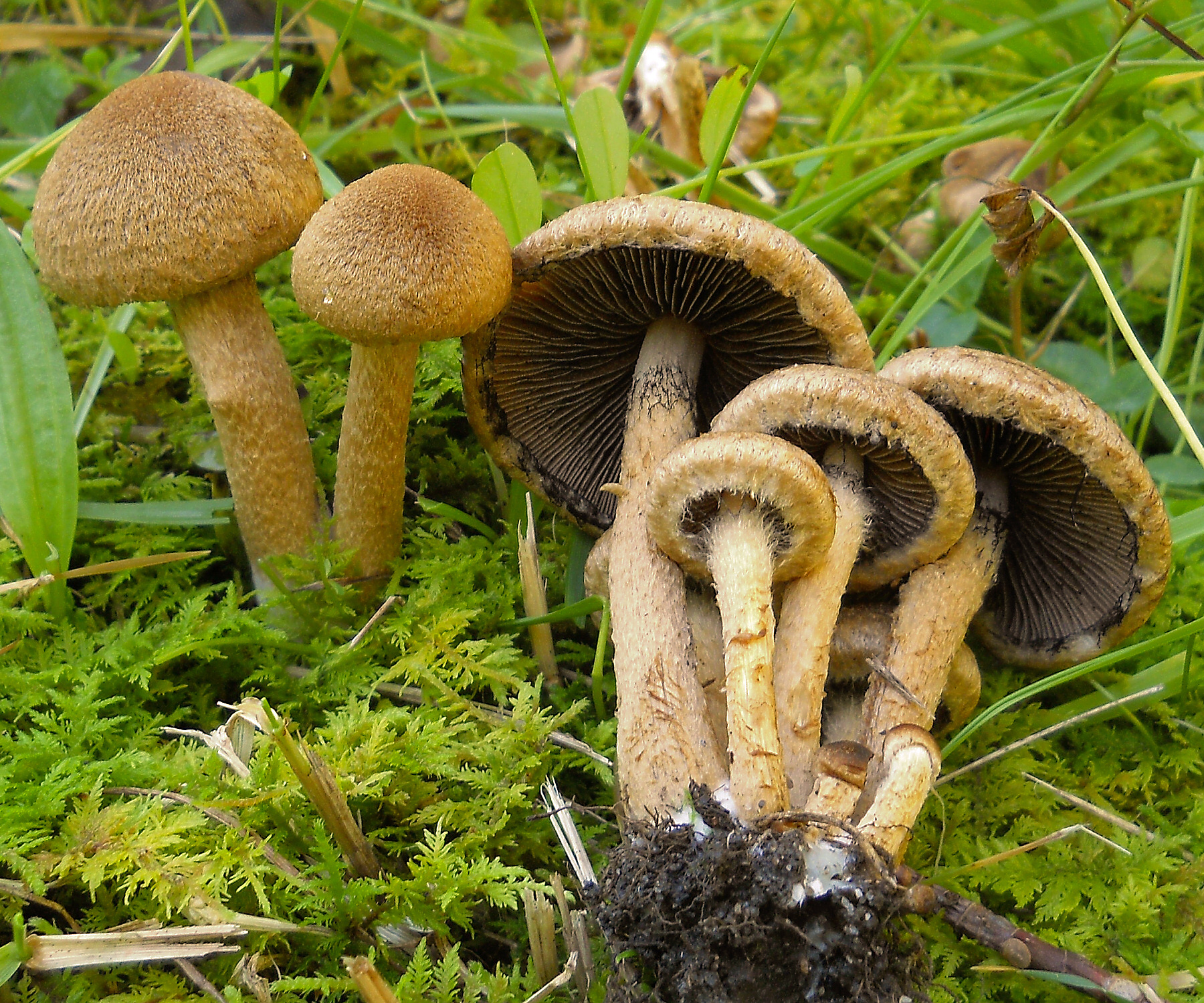
- Lacrymaria lacrymabunda

Scientific classification
- Kingdom: Fungi
- Division: Basidiomycota
- Class: Agaricomycetes
- Order: Agaricales
- Family: Psathyrellaceae; Vilgalys, Moncalvo & Redhead (2001)

Type genus
- Psathyrella (Fr.) Quél. (1872)

Genera
- Britzelmayria; Coprinellus; Coprinopsis; Cystoagaricus; Gasteroagaricoides; Hausknechtia; Heteropsathyrella; Homophron; Hormographiella; Kauffmania; Lacrymaria; Macrometrula; Narcissea; Olotia †Palaeocybe; Parasola; Psathyrella; Punjabia; Tulosesus; Typhrasa

= Psathyrellaceae =

Family of fungi

The Psathyrellaceae are a family of dark-spored agarics that generally have rather soft, fragile fruiting bodies, and are characterized by black, dark brown, rarely reddish, or even pastel-colored spore prints. About 50% of species produce fruiting bodies that dissolve into ink-like ooze when the spores are mature via autodigestion. Prior to phylogenetic research based upon DNA comparisons, most of the species that autodigested were classified as Coprinaceae, which contained all of the inky-cap mushrooms. However, the type species of Coprinus, Coprinus comatus, and a few other species, were found to be more closely related to Agaricaceae. The former genus Coprinus was split between two families, and the name "Coprinaceae" became a synonym of Agaricaceae in its 21st-century phylogenetic redefinition. Note that in the 19th and early 20th centuries the family name Agaricaceae had far broader application, while in the late 20th century it had a narrower application. The family name Psathyrellaceae is based on the former Coprinaceae subfamily name Psathyrelloideae. The type genus Psathyrella consists of species that produce fruiting bodies which do not liquefy via autodigestion. Psathyrella remained a polyphyletic genus until it was split into several genera including 3 new ones in 2015. Lacrymaria is another genus that does not autodigest. It is characterized by rough basidiospores and lamellar edges that exude beads of clear liquid when in prime condition, hence the Latin reference, lacryma (tears).

Most Psathyrellaceae basidiospores have germ pores, and the pigment in the spore walls bleaches when soaked in concentrated sulfuric acid. This contrasts with another phylogenetically unrelated dark-spored genus, Panaeolus. Psathyrellaceae are saprotrophs or rarely mycoparasites on other agarics (e.g. Psathyrella epimyces). They often occur in nitrogen-rich habitats such as dung, wet soft decayed wood, lawns and gardens.

== Genera Coprinellus, Coprinopsis and Parasola ==
Species in the genera Coprinellus, Coprinopsis and Parasola were until recently classified in the genus Coprinus, or in the case of a few Coprinellus species, in Pseudocoprinus. Based on molecular data, the genus Coprinus was divided, with these three genera moved to the family Psathyrellaceae. .

Coprinellus is a genus first described by Petter Karsten in 1879. Coprinopsis was split from the genus Coprinus based on molecular data. The species Coprinopsis cinerea is a model organism for mushroom-forming Basidiomycota as it has a complete genome sequence available and is easy to culture.

== See also ==
- List of Agaricales families
