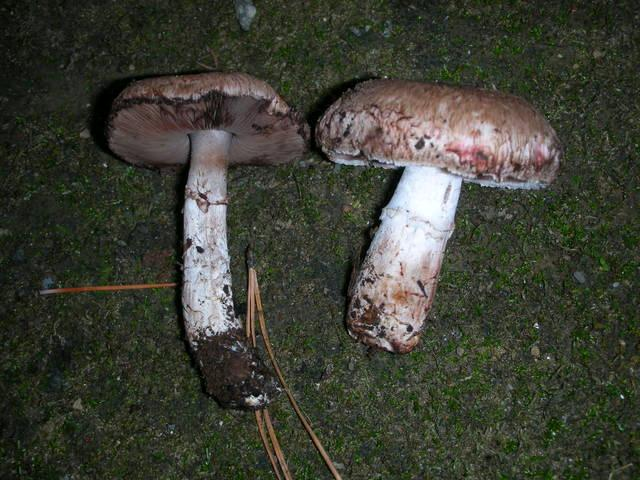
- A pair of Agaricus arorae

Scientific classification
- Kingdom: Fungi
- Division: Basidiomycota
- Class: Agaricomycetes
- Order: Agaricales
- Family: Agaricaceae
- Genus: Agaricus
- Species: A. arorae

Binomial name
- Agaricus arorae Kerrigan

= Agaricus arorae =

Species of fungus

Agaricus arorae
- Mycological characteristics
- Gills on hymenium
- Cap is convex or flat
- Hymenium is free
- Stipe has a ring
- Spore print is brown
- Ecology is saprotrophic
- Edibility is unknown

Agaricus arorae is a moderate-sized, forest-dwelling mushroom that exhibits certain color changes and is distinguished by its scales and stipe.

== Taxonomy ==
Agaricus arorae was named after American mycologist and author David Arora.

Arora surmised that it was an intermediate taxon between red-staining and yellow-staining sections of Agaricus.

== Description ==
The cap is 3–7 centimetres (1 1/4–2 3/4 in) wide and convex before becoming flattening. It is white to reddish, with brownish fibrils or scales in the center and sometimes elsewhere. The surface yellows with potassium hydroxide (KOH) and the flesh slowly bruises a reddish colour. With a dry surface, the cap's disc can be glabrous or tomentose. The cap has an indistinct odor with a mild taste. The context can be as large as 5 mm thick, soft, and bruises irregularly a vinaceous colour where cut.

The gills are free and close. They are pinkish at first then become dark brown. The spores are 4–5.5 x 3–4 μm, elliptical, and smooth. They are inequilateral in profile and moderately thick-walled, lacking a germ pore.

The stipe is 5–14 cm long and 0.5–2 cm thick. At the base, it is slightly enlarged and becomes stuffed at maturity. The white veil is rather membranous and yields a thin ring. When cut, the cortex discolours to pinkish-orange. The stipe base changes brown to rusty-brown from handling. The margin is sometimes light brown. The apex surface is white and patchy fibrillose over a dull-buff ground color.

=== Identification ===
Agaricus arorae resembles A. amicosus, A. bisporus, A. fuscofibrillosus, and A. spissicaulis. It can be distinguished from some species by its conspicuous stipe and scales, if present.

== Distribution and habitat ==
Agaricus arorae was first described from Santa Cruz County, California, and since has been found in San Mateo and Alameda counties.

== See also ==
- List of Agaricus species
