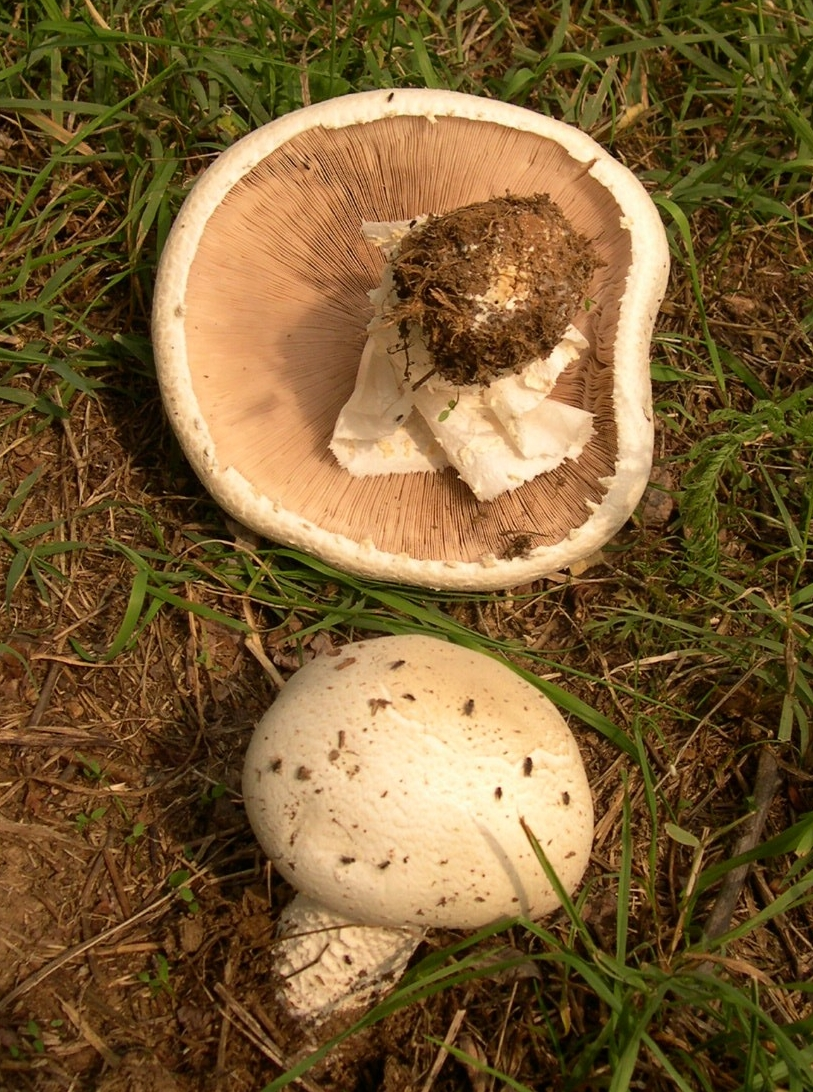

Scientific classification
- Kingdom: Fungi
- Division: Basidiomycota
- Class: Agaricomycetes
- Order: Agaricales
- Family: Agaricaceae
- Genus: Agaricus
- Species: A. macrosporus

Binomial name
- Agaricus macrosporus (F.H.Møller & Jul.Schff.) Pilát (1951)

Synonyms
- Psalliota arvensis subsp. macrospora F.H.Møller & Jul.Schäff. (1938); Psalliota macrospora (F.H.Møller & Jul.Schäff.) F.H.Møller (1951); Agaricus albertii Bon (1988)

= Agaricus macrosporus =

Species of fungus

Agaricus macrosporus
- Mycological characteristics
- Gills on hymenium
- Cap is convex
- Hymenium is free
- Stipe has a ring
- Spore print is purple-brown
- Ecology is saprotrophic
- Edibility is edible

Agaricus macrosporus is a species of fungus.

== Description ==
The white cap is hemispherical and white when young, but later flattens out up to 25 centimetres (10 inches) in diameter and becomes yellowish or tan. Its flesh is very thick. The gills are pinkish grey when young, and become brown with age. The stem is strong and thick, with a broad ring. It may measure 8 to 12 cm (3 to 4 1/2 in) in height and up to 3 cm in diameter.

The flesh is white with a mild taste and a smell of aniseed, turning slowly orange when cut. The spores measure 12 by 6 μm and are purplish-brown and almond-shaped.

=== Similar species ===
It is possible to confuse this mushroom with dangerous Amanitas such as A. phalloides and A. pantherina.

Agaricus excellens differs by its taller and slimmer stipe which is striped lengthwise. Agaricus augustus does not have the pure white cap in young specimens.

== Distribution and habitat ==
The species is rare and found from June at wood fringes and in meadows.

== See also ==
- List of Agaricus species
