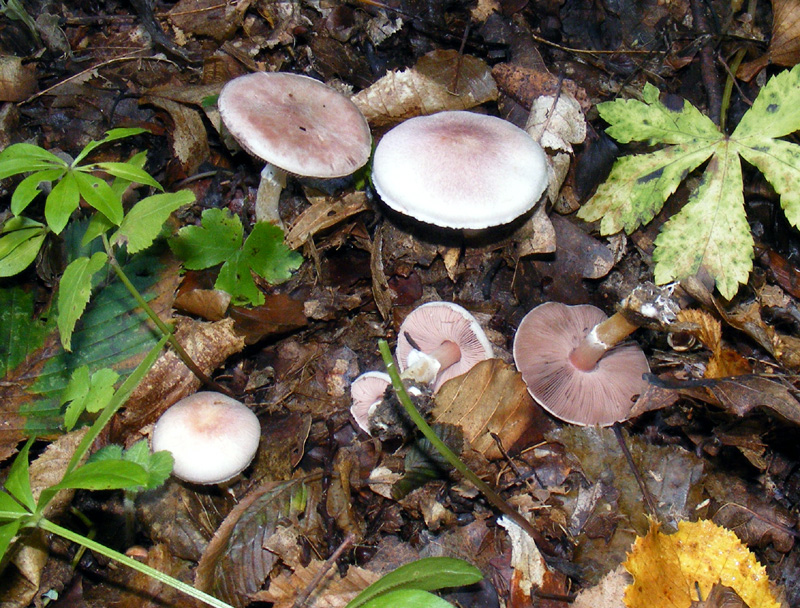

Scientific classification
- Domain: Eukaryota
- Kingdom: Fungi
- Division: Basidiomycota
- Class: Agaricomycetes
- Order: Agaricales
- Family: Agaricaceae
- Genus: Agaricus
- Species: A. dulcidulus

Binomial name
- Agaricus dulcidulus Schulzer (1874)

Synonyms
- Agaricus purpurellus (F.H.Møller) F.H.Møller; Agaricus rubelloides Bon; Agaricus rubellus (Gillet) Sacc. Fungus dulcidulus (Schulzer) Kuntze; Pratella rubella Gillet; Pratella silvatica var. rubella (Gillet) L.Corb. Psalliota amethystina sensu Lange; Psalliota pallens (J.E.Lange) Rea; Psalliota purpurella F.H.Møller; Psalliota rubella (Gillet) Rea; Psalliota rubella f. pallens J.E.Lange

= Agaricus dulcidulus =

Species of fungus

Agaricus dulcidulus Mycological characteristics
- Gills on hymenium
- Cap is convex or flat
- Hymenium is free
- Stipe has a ring
- Spore print is brown
- Ecology is saprotrophic
- Edibility is edible

Agaricus dulcidulus is a small mushroom in the family Agaricaceae of the order Agaricales, found in deciduous woodlands of Europe, but also recorded in North America, North Africa and Asia. The English name is rosy wood mushroom. Despite the tendency of some sources to synonymize it with Agaricus semotus, this is a distinct taxon.

== Description ==
Cap 2 to 7 cm, convex-rounded often with inflexed margins at first, then flattens when aging, covered in purple-brown to pinkish dense fibriles that fade in colours towards light grayish-pink from the centre towards margins.

The gills are free from attachment to the stipe, dense, starting pale gray-brownish when young, then turning dark purple-brown with age, with a lighter crenulated edge. The stipe is cylindrical, 2–5 cm long and 0.4–0.8 cm broad, bulbous or clavated at the base, whitish, slightly darkening toward the base in yellow-brownish tints. The ring, remnant of the veil present in young fructifications, is whitish, descendent, thin and fragile. The odor and taste resembles almonds.

The spore print is dark brownish. The spores are 4.5–6.0 x 3.5–4.0 μm on average, nonamyloid, and elliptical. The flesh turns slightly in yellow when cut or bruised, sometime with orange tints in stipe.

Macrochemical reactions: flesh turns orange and pileus turns yellow in contact with 10% KOH.

== Other taxonomic considerations ==
Several characteristics like flesh yellowing on contact or in air, orange reaction with KOH, overall size, puts this species within Minores section of the genus Agaricus, along with Agaricus comtulus, Agaricus xantholepis, Agaricus porphyrizon and Agaricus luteomaculatus.

== Habitat ==
Agaricus dulcidulus is a mycorrhizal species in close relation with different oak species. The fungus prefers humid soil with rich decomposed leaves as a substrate. The basidiocarps appear, depending on microclimatic conditions, in late July to early October.

== Edibility ==
Although considered to be edible, the small size and usually the sporadic presence prevents it from being widely eaten.

== See also ==
- List of Agaricus species
