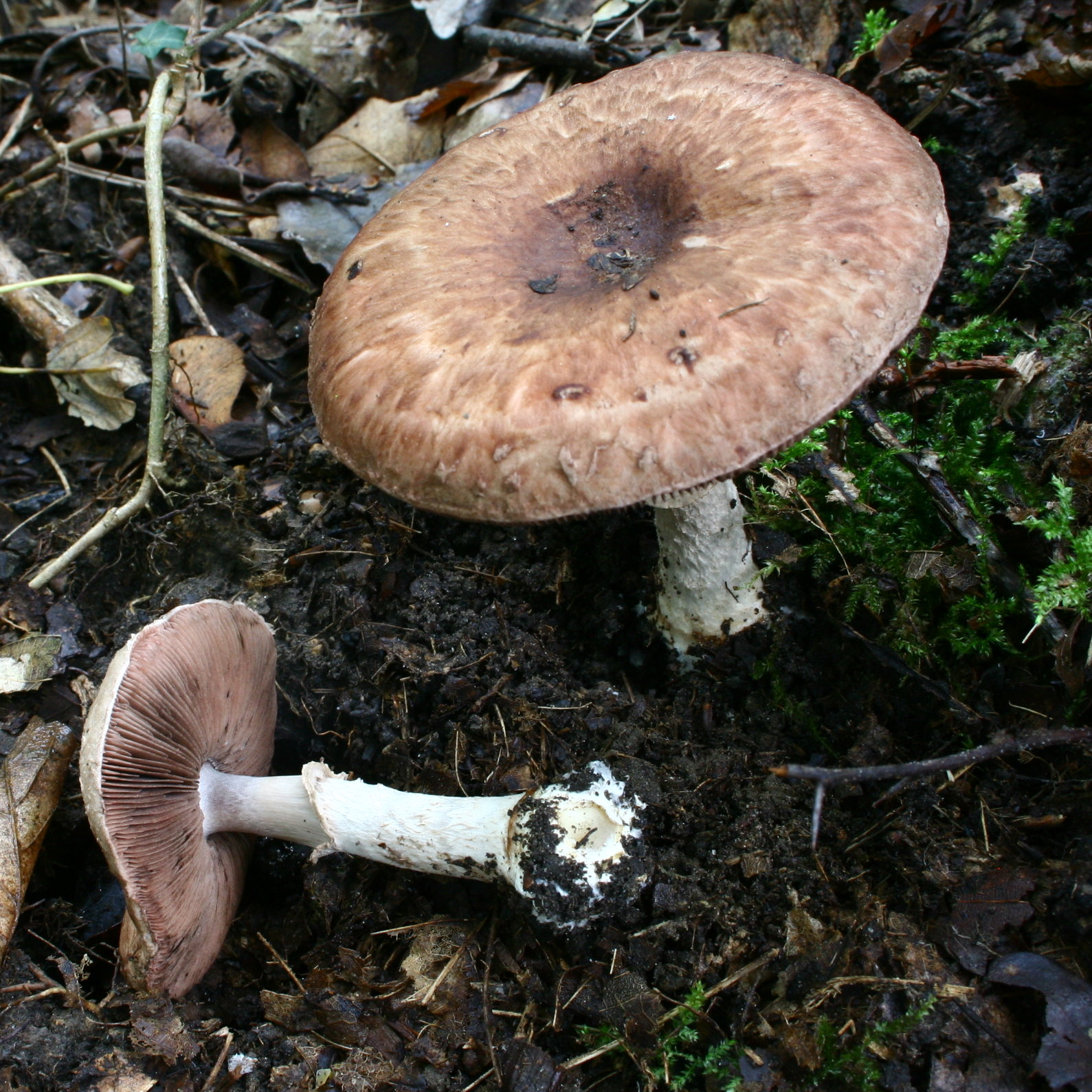

Scientific classification
- Kingdom: Fungi
- Division: Basidiomycota
- Class: Agaricomycetes
- Order: Agaricales
- Family: Agaricaceae
- Genus: Agaricus
- Species: A. lanipes

Binomial name
- Agaricus lanipes (F.H. Møller & Jul. Schäff.) Hlaváček

Synonyms
- List: Agaricus lanipes (F.H. Møller & Jul. Schäff.) Pilát; Agaricus lanipes (F.H. Moller & J. Schaeff.) Sing.; Psalliota lanipes F.H. Møller & Jul. Schäff.; Agaricus lanipes var. luteolorufescens (P.D. Orton) Bon & Courtec.; Agaricus luteolorufescens P.D. Orton; Agaricus lanipes var. macrosporus Saini, Atri & A.K. Gupta; Agaricus lanipes var. verecundus (F.H. Møller) F.H. Møller; Psalliota lanipes var. verecunda F.H. Møller

= Agaricus lanipes =

Species of fungus

Agaricus lanipes is a species of fungus belonging to the division Basidiomycota. The species was first described by F.H. Møller and Julius Schäffer, and was given its current name by Hlaváček in 1949. Agaricus lanipes is classified in the genus Agaricus and the family Agaricaceae. No subspecies have been identified.
