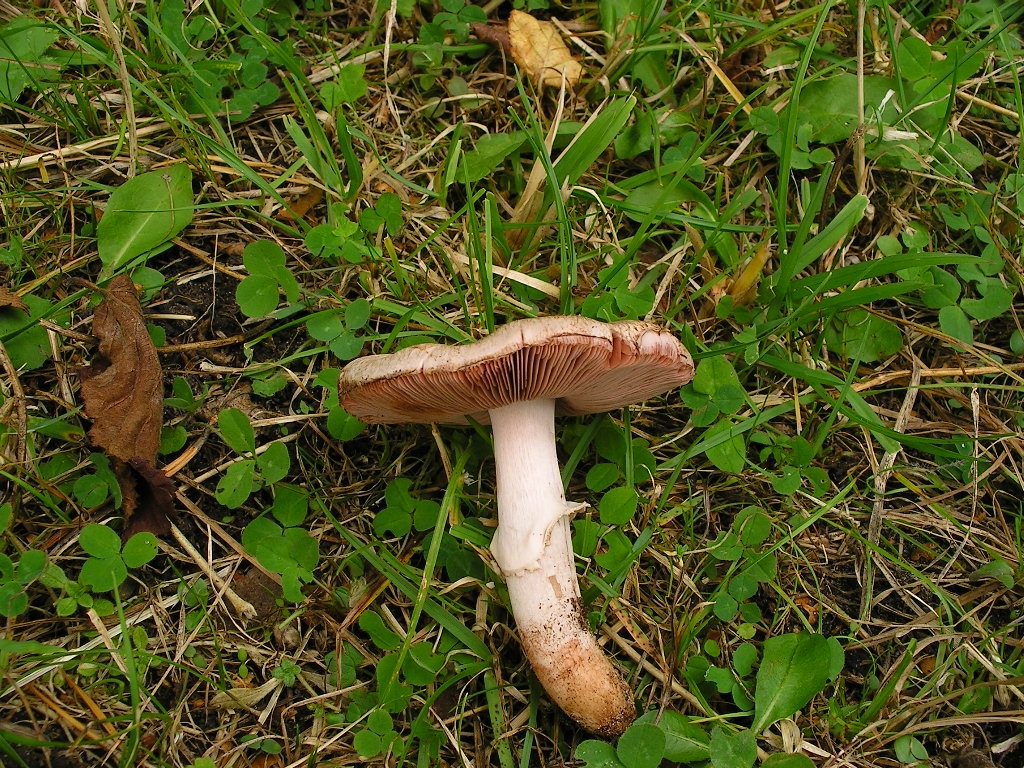

Scientific classification
- Kingdom: Fungi
- Division: Basidiomycota
- Class: Agaricomycetes
- Order: Agaricales
- Family: Agaricaceae
- Genus: Agaricus
- Species: A. langei

Binomial name
- Agaricus langei (F.H.Møller) F.H.Møller (1952)

Synonyms
- Psalliota langei F.H.Møller (1950); Psalliota fuscofibrillosa F.H.Møller (1950); Psalliota mediofusca F.H.Møller (1950); Agaricus fuscofibrillosus (F.H.Møller) Pilát (1951); Agaricus mediofuscus (F.H.Møller) Pilát (1951); Agaricus langei var. mediofuscus (F.H.Møller) Wasser (1978); Agaricus langei var. sylvaticoides Bon (1981)

= Agaricus langei =

Species of fungus

Agaricus langei is a species of fungus in the genus Agaricus.

== See also ==
- List of Agaricus species
