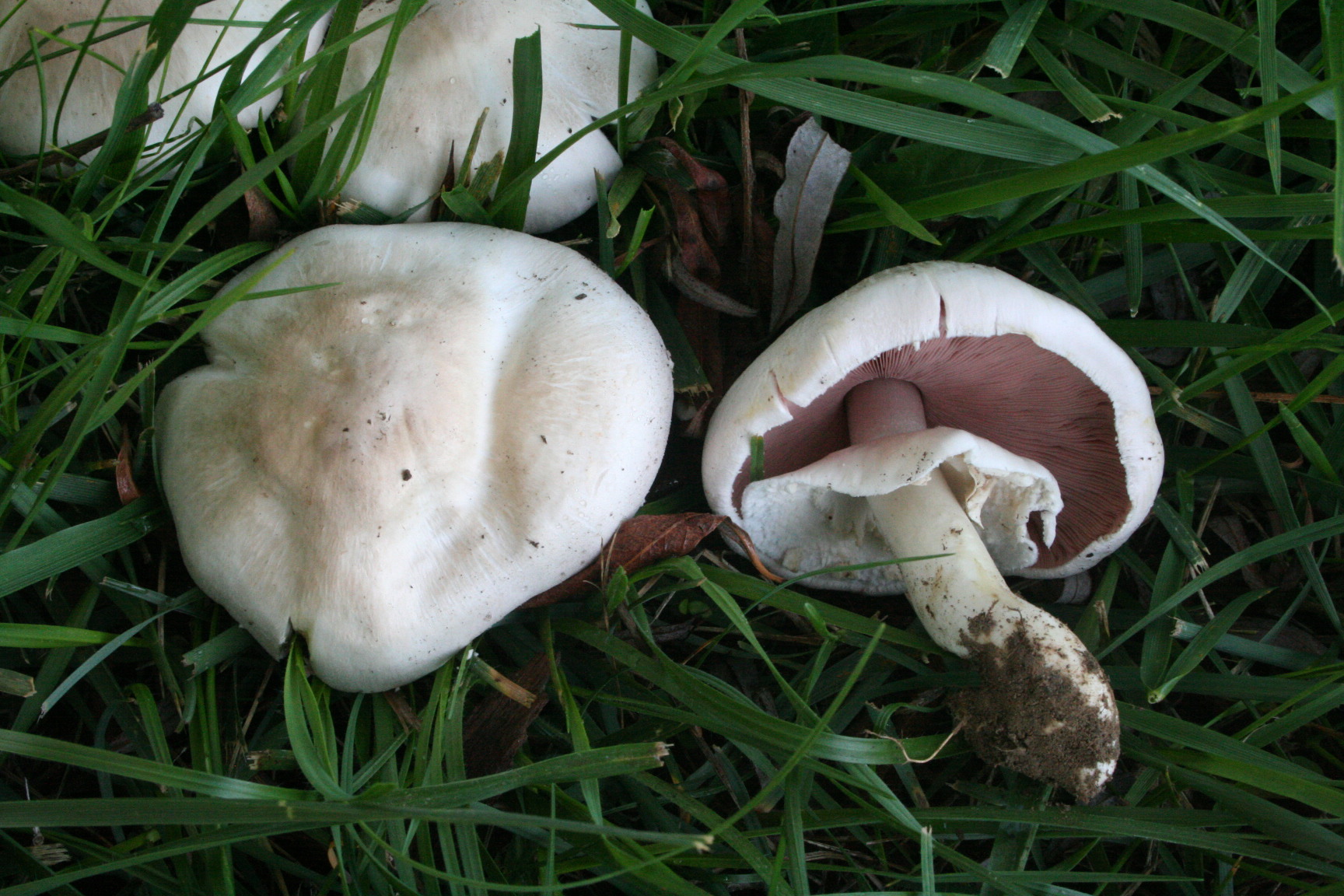

Scientific classification
- Domain: Eukaryota
- Kingdom: Fungi
- Division: Basidiomycota
- Class: Agaricomycetes
- Order: Agaricales
- Family: Agaricaceae
- Genus: Agaricus
- Species: A. pilatianus

Binomial name
- Agaricus pilatianus (Bohus) Bohus

= Agaricus pilatianus =

Species of fungus

Agaricus pilatianus Mycological characteristics
- Gills on hymenium
- Cap is convex or flat
- Hymenium is free
- Stipe has a ring
- Spore print is brown
- Ecology is saprotrophic
- Edibility is poisonous

Agaricus pilatianus (Bohus) is a rare species of poisonous mushroom found in Europe. It is a white to cream colour that discolours when cut, bruised or damaged. The cap can reach sizes of up to 12 centimetres (4.7 in) and can grow to 8 centimetres (3.1 in) in height.
