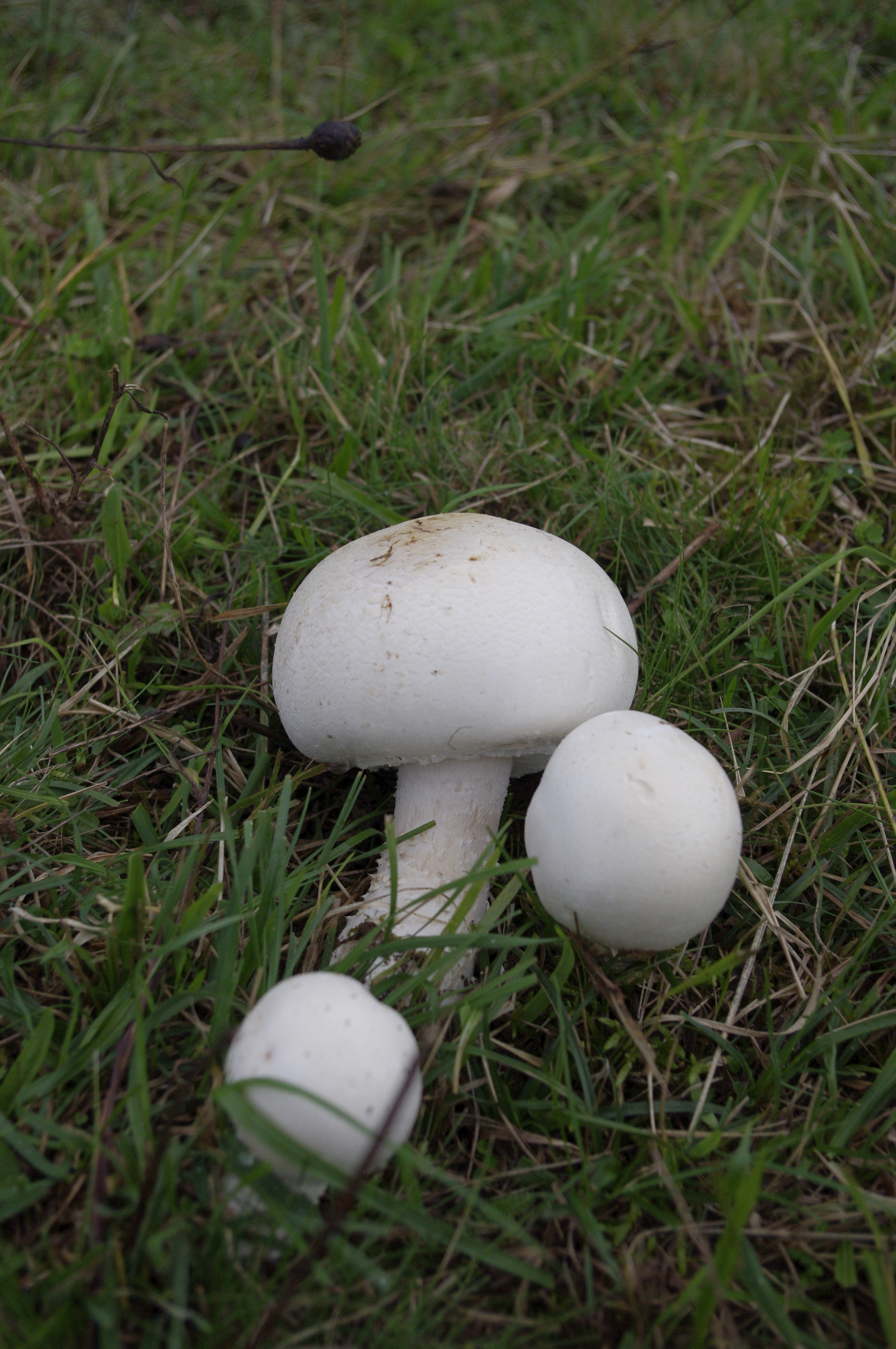
- At Javerlhac-et-la-Chapelle-Saint-Robert

Scientific classification
- Kingdom: Fungi
- Division: Basidiomycota
- Class: Agaricomycetes
- Order: Agaricales
- Family: Agaricaceae
- Genus: Agaricus
- Species: A. urinascens

Binomial name
- Agaricus urinascens (Jul.Schäff. & F.H.Møller) Singer

Synonyms
- List: Agaricus albertii Bon; Agaricus excellens F.H.Møller; Agaricus macrosporus var. stramineus (Jul.Schäff. & F.H.Møller) Bon; Agaricus schaefferianus Hlaváček; Agaricus stramineosquamulosus Rauschert; Agaricus substramineus Courtec.; Agaricus urinascens var. excellens (F.H.Møller) Nauta; Psalliota arvensis subsp. macrospora F.H.Møller & Jul.Schäff.; Psalliota excellens F.H.Møller; Psalliota macrospora (F.H.Møller & Jul.Schäff.) F.H.Møller; Psalliota straminea Jul.Schäff. & F.H.Møller; Psalliota urinascens Jul.Schäff. & F.H.Møller; Agaricus macrosporus (F.H.Møller & Jul.Schäff.) Pilát (Ambiguous); Agaricus stramineus (Jul.Schäff. & F.H.Møller) Singer (Ambiguous)

= Agaricus urinascens =

Edible mushroom species

Agaricus urinascens (the macro mushroom) is a species of fungus in the family Agaricaceae.

The mushroom grows up to 30 centimetres (12 in) wide and 12 cm (4 3/4 in) tall. The cap is whitish, domed then becoming convex in age. The gills are whitish, then darken to pink or brownish with age. The flesh is white with an almond scent.

It can be found in pastures of Europe from June to September. It is edible when cooked and can be dried for preservation.
