= Agaricus freirei =

Scientific classification
- Domain: Eukaryota
- Kingdom: Fungi
- Division: Basidiomycota
- Class: Agaricomycetes
- Order: Agaricales
- Family: Agaricaceae
- Genus: Agaricus
- Species: A. freirei

Binomial name
- Agaricus freirei Blanco-Dios (2001)

Species of fungus

Agaricus freirei is a species of fungus in the family Agaricaceae. Agaricus freirei closely resembles A. hondensis, and, based on similarities in DNA sequences, is a close relative. Described as new to science in 2001, A. freirei is found in coastal regions of Spain.

== See also ==
- List of Agaricus species
