= Agaricus alabamensis =

Scientific classification
- Domain: Eukaryota
- Kingdom: Fungi
- Division: Basidiomycota
- Class: Agaricomycetes
- Order: Agaricales
- Family: Agaricaceae
- Genus: Agaricus
- Species: A. alabamensis

Binomial name
- Agaricus alabamensis Murrill

Species of fungus

Agaricus alabamensis is a North American species of mushroom in the genus Agaricus. This species is in the family Agaricaceae. Its spores have a dark chocolate color.
