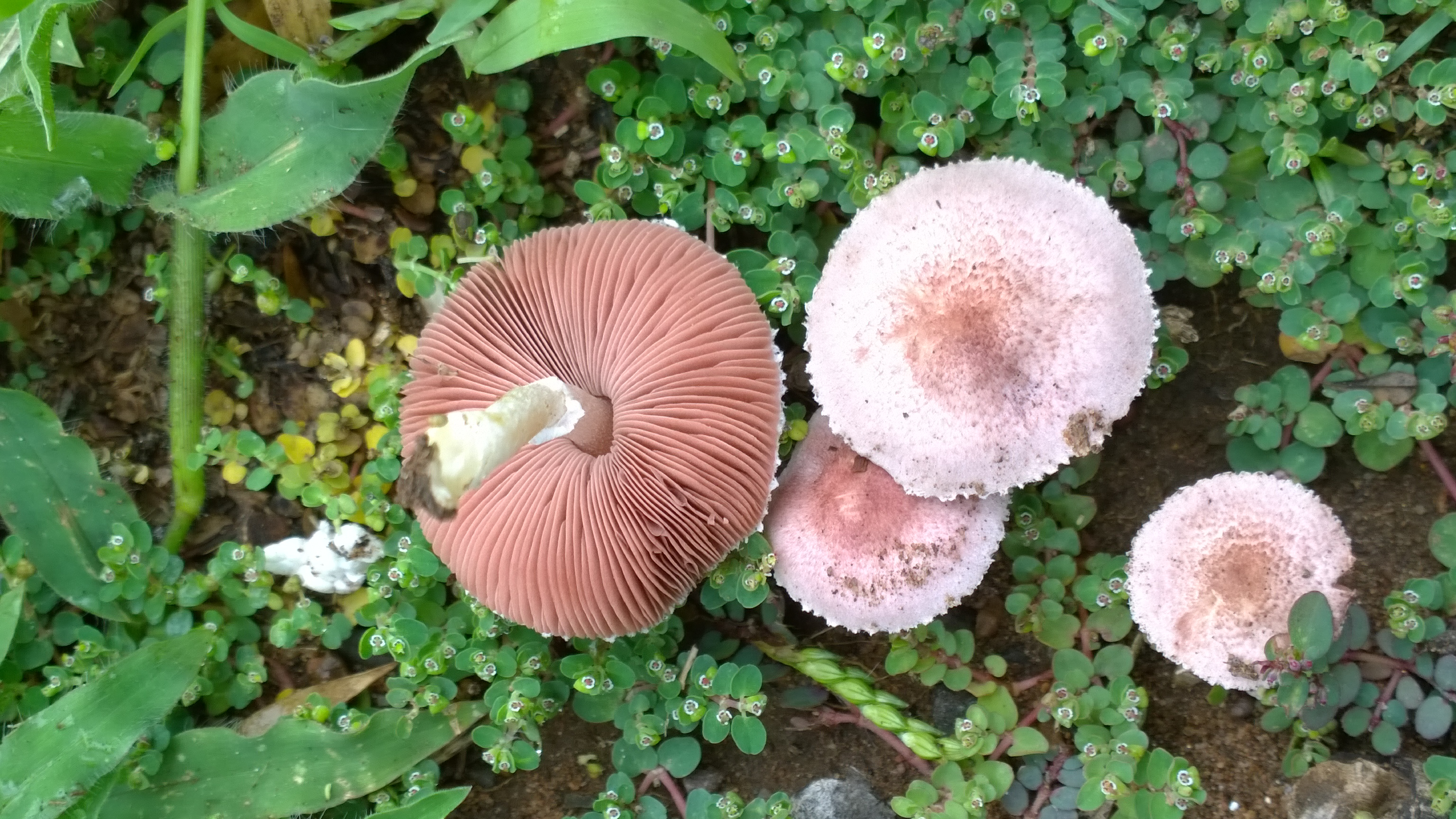

Scientific classification
- Kingdom: Fungi
- Division: Basidiomycota
- Class: Agaricomycetes
- Order: Agaricales
- Family: Agaricaceae
- Genus: Agaricus
- Species: A. diminutivus

Binomial name
- Agaricus diminutivus Peck

= Agaricus diminutivus =

Agaricus diminutivus
- Mycological characteristics
- Gills on hymenium
- Cap is ovate or flat
- Hymenium is free
- Stipe has a ring or is bare
- Spore print is brown
- Edibility is not recommended

Agaricus diminutivus, commonly known as the diminutive agaricus, is a species of mushroom in the genus Agaricus. It is unique among its genus due to its small size, and was first described in 1873.

== Description ==
The cap of Agaricus diminutivus is about 1-3 centimeters in diameter. It starts out round or ovoid, becoming convex or flat. It is pale, often being whitish or tannish. The stipe is 2-6 centimeters long and 3-10 millimeters wide, with a ring around it that sometimes disappears. The gills are free, and start out a pale pinkish tan color becoming pink and finally brown. The mushroom's flesh both bruises slightly yellow and turns yellow when potassium hydroxide (KOH) is applied. The spore print is brown.

While likely edible, this mushroom is not recommended as food because it can be confused with poisonous Inocybe species. It is also very small and not very common.

Agaricus diminutivus is actually a species complex, consisting of multiple closely related species that are difficult to distinguish from one another.

== Habitat and Distribution ==
Agaricus diminutivus grows in forests on patches of grass, especially under conifers. It fruits during autumn. Grows in groups, close together or spread far apart. It is found in the US, Canada, Japan, and South Africa.
