= Agaricus aurantioviolaceus =

Scientific classification
- Domain: Eukaryota
- Kingdom: Fungi
- Division: Basidiomycota
- Class: Agaricomycetes
- Order: Agaricales
- Family: Agaricaceae
- Genus: Agaricus
- Species: A. aurantioviolaceus

Binomial name
- Agaricus aurantioviolaceus (R.Heim) Walleyn & Rammeloo (1994)

Synonyms
- Psalliota aurantioviolacea R.Heim (1968)

Species of fungus

Agaricus auranteoviolaceus Mycological characteristics
- Gills on hymenium
- Cap is convex
- Hymenium is free
- Spore print is brown
- Ecology is saprotrophic
- Edibility is unknown

Agaricus aurantioviolaceus is a species of fungus in the genus Agaricus. Found in Africa, it was originally named as a species of Psalliota by mycologist Roger Heim in 1968. It was transferred to Agaricus in 1994. The mushroom is suspected to be poisonous.

== See also ==
- List of Agaricus species
