= Agaricus braendlei =

Scientific classification
- Kingdom: Fungi
- Division: Basidiomycota
- Class: Agaricomycetes
- Order: Agaricales
- Family: Agaricaceae
- Genus: Agaricus
- Species: A. braendlei

Binomial name
- Agaricus braendlei L.A. Parra & M.M. Gómez

Synonyms
- List: Agaricus argenteus Braendle ex Peck; Agaricus argenteus subsp. annetteae Kerrigan; Agaricus argenteus var. annetteae (Kerrigan) Blanco-Dios; Agaricus braendlei subsp. annetteae (Kerrigan) Kerrigan

Species of fungus

Agaricus braendlei
- Mycological characteristics
- Gills on hymenium
- Cap is convex
- Hymenium is free
- Stipe is bare
- Spore print is brown
- Ecology is saprotrophic
- Edibility is choice

Agaricus braendlei is a species of mushroom in the family Agaricaceae. It is found in North America, and closely related to A. campestris. Both species are popular edibles characterized by white, slightly furry caps, bright pink gills which turn to chocolate brown as the spore mature, and no staining reaction when bruised or scratched. Like most Agaricus species, this species has a ring on the stalk and no volva.
