= Agaricus annae =

Scientific classification
- Domain: Eukaryota
- Kingdom: Fungi
- Division: Basidiomycota
- Class: Agaricomycetes
- Order: Agaricales
- Family: Agaricaceae
- Genus: Agaricus
- Species: A. annae

Binomial name
- Agaricus annae Pilat (1951)

Species of fungus

Agaricus annae is a species of mushroom in the genus Agaricus. This species is in the family Agaricaceae.
