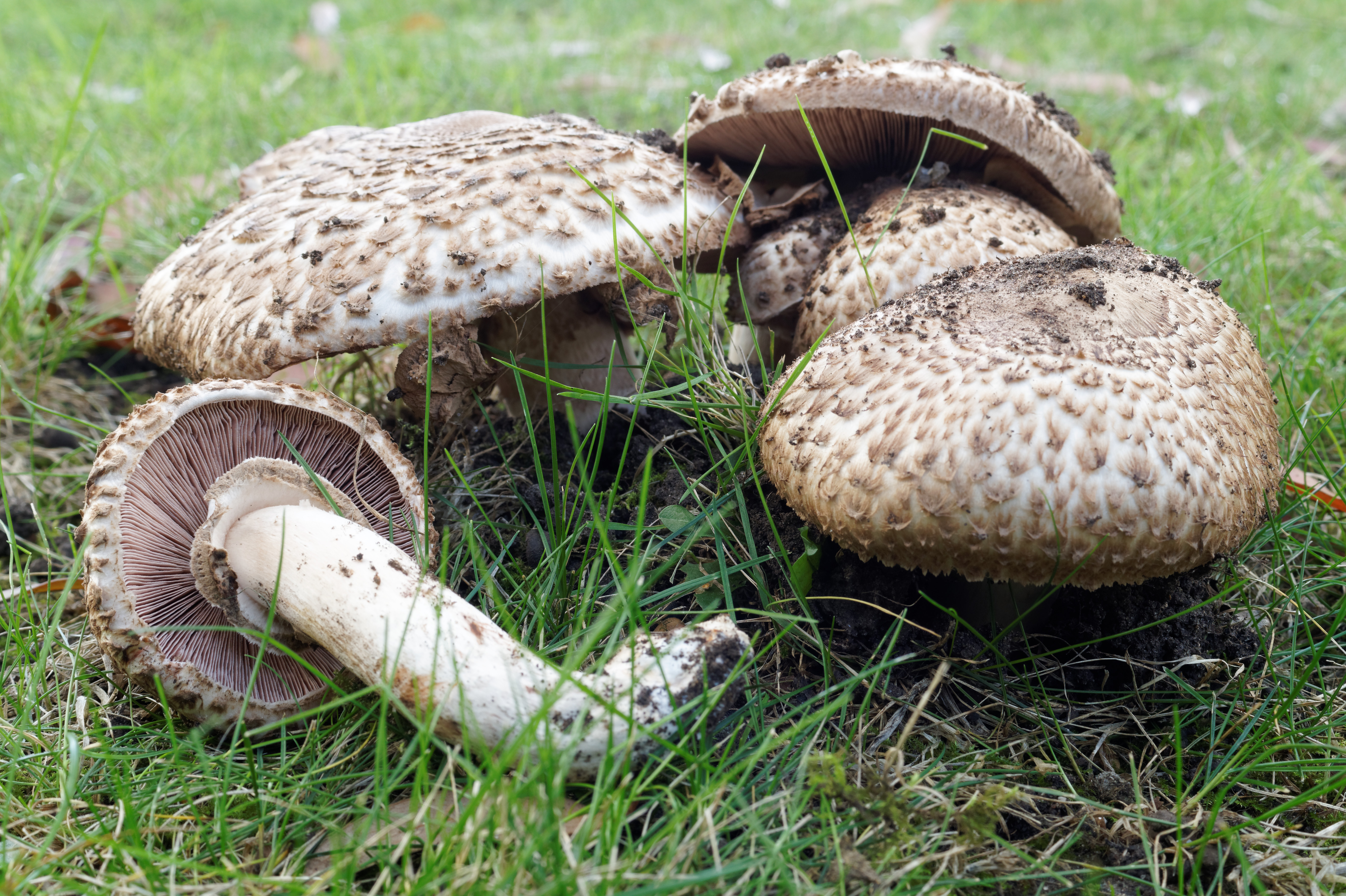

Scientific classification
- Kingdom: Fungi
- Division: Basidiomycota
- Class: Agaricomycetes
- Order: Agaricales
- Family: Agaricaceae
- Genus: Agaricus
- Species: A. bohusii

Binomial name
- Agaricus bohusii Bon (1983)

= Agaricus bohusii =

Species of fungus

Agaricus bohusii is a species of mushroom described by Marcel Bon in 1983. Its common name in English is Medusa mushroom.
