= Agaricus agrinferus =

Scientific classification
- Kingdom: Fungi
- Division: Basidiomycota
- Class: Agaricomycetes
- Order: Agaricales
- Family: Nidulariaceae
- Genus: Agaricus
- Species: A. agrinferus

Binomial name
- Agaricus agrinferus Kerrigan and Callac (2008)

Species of fungus

Agaricus agrinferus is a species of fungus in the genus Agaricus . Agaricus agrinferus is found in the northern hemisphere in places such as California.
