= Agaricus angusticystidiatus =

Scientific classification
- Domain: Eukaryota
- Kingdom: Fungi
- Division: Basidiomycota
- Class: Agaricomycetes
- Order: Agaricales
- Family: Agaricaceae
- Genus: Agaricus
- Species: A. angusticystidiatus

Binomial name
- Agaricus angusticystidiatus He et al. (2018)

Species of fungus

Agaricus angusticystidiatus is a species of fungus in the family Agaricaceae. It has a diameter of 40–80 mm and is found in Southeast Asia.
