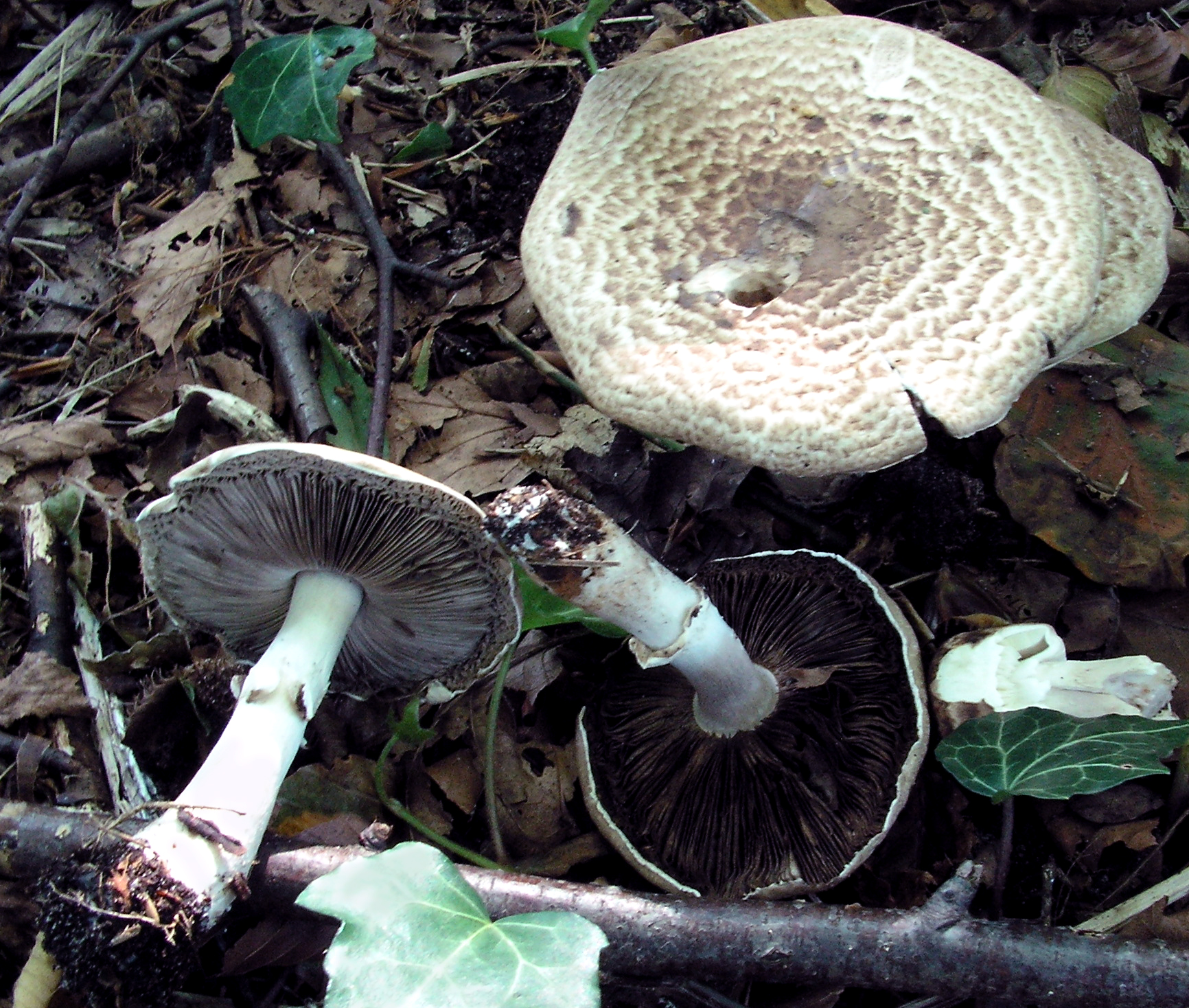

Scientific classification
- Kingdom: Fungi
- Division: Basidiomycota
- Class: Agaricomycetes
- Order: Agaricales
- Family: Agaricaceae
- Genus: Agaricus
- Species: A. impudicus

Binomial name
- Agaricus impudicus (Rea) Pilát (1951)

Synonyms
- Psalliota impudica Rea (1932)

= Agaricus impudicus =

Species of fungus

Agaricus impudicus Mycological characteristics
- Gills on hymenium
- Cap is convex
- Hymenium is free
- Stipe has a ring
- Spore print is brown
- Ecology is saprotrophic
- Edibility is edible, but unpalatable

Agaricus impudicus, also known as the tufted wood mushroom, is a mushroom of Agaricus, a genus with many edible species.

== Description ==
As with all Agaricus species, gills are free, colour progresses with age from pale-pink to a chocolate color, and spores are dark brown. The stipe has a clear annulus (ring).

Cap 4–15 cm wide, and appears brownish due to numerous brownish scales on a white background. The stipe is white, 6–12 cm tall and 0.8–2 cm thick, cylindrical and wider towards the bottom, or ending in a bulb.

It is distinguished from similar forest-growing Agaricus mushrooms in that it does not bruise yellowish or reddish when cut, except for the attachment of stalk and cap which may turn slightly pink, and the widening stipe. Taste is mild and earthy, and the mushroom is sometimes regarded as edible; however, other authors treat it as inedible in practice if not in theory because it has a nauseating smell resembling rotten radish, which persists during cooking.

== Habitat ==
Known to occur in Western and Southern Europe and New Zealand, this uncommon mushroom is found in deciduous or coniferous forest in autumn.

== Taxonomy ==
This species is known under a number of synonyms, all these refer to the same species:

- Agaricus brunnoleus (J. Lange) Pilát
- Agaricus koelerionensis (Bon) Bon 1980
- Agaricus reae Bon 1981
- Agaricus variegans F.H. Møller 1952
- Agaricus variegatus (F.H. Møller) Pilát 1951
- Psalliota impudica Rea 1932
- Psalliota variegata F.H. Møller 1950
- Psalliota variegata var. koelerionis Bon 1972

== See also ==
- List of Agaricus species
