= Agaricus abramsii =

Scientific classification
- Kingdom: Fungi
- Division: Basidiomycota
- Class: Agaricomycetes
- Order: Agaricales
- Family: Agaricaceae
- Genus: Agaricus
- Species: A. abramsii

Binomial name
- Agaricus abramsii Murrill

Species of mushroom

Agaricus abramsii is a species of mushroom-forming fungus in the family Agaricaceae. It is endemic to the Santa Cruz Mountains of California, USA. It was first described by mycologist William A. Murrill in 1912. It is notable for its irregular, thick, and fleshy cap.

== Description ==
The pileus (cap) of Agaricus abramsii is irregular in shape due to the position of the fruiting body, measuring approximately 6 cm in diameter. The surface is dry, finely imbricate-scaly, and whitish with a rosy tint. The lamellae (gills) are free, crowded, narrow, and plane, with a pallid coloration. Spores are ovoid, smooth, and range from hyaline to pale umbrinous under a microscope, measuring 6–7 × 3.5–4 μm. The stipe (stem) is eccentric and fusiform, white, polished, and hollow, measuring approximately 6 cm in length and 2 cm in thickness. The annulus is located near the base, white, and not conspicuous.

== Habitat ==
Agaricus abramsii was discovered growing on a clay bank by the roadside at an elevation of 800 feet in the Santa Cruz Mountains near Palo Alto, California. The type specimen was collected by W. A. Murrill and L. R. Abrams on November 25, 1911. The irregular shape of the pileus is attributed to its position on the side of the bank.
