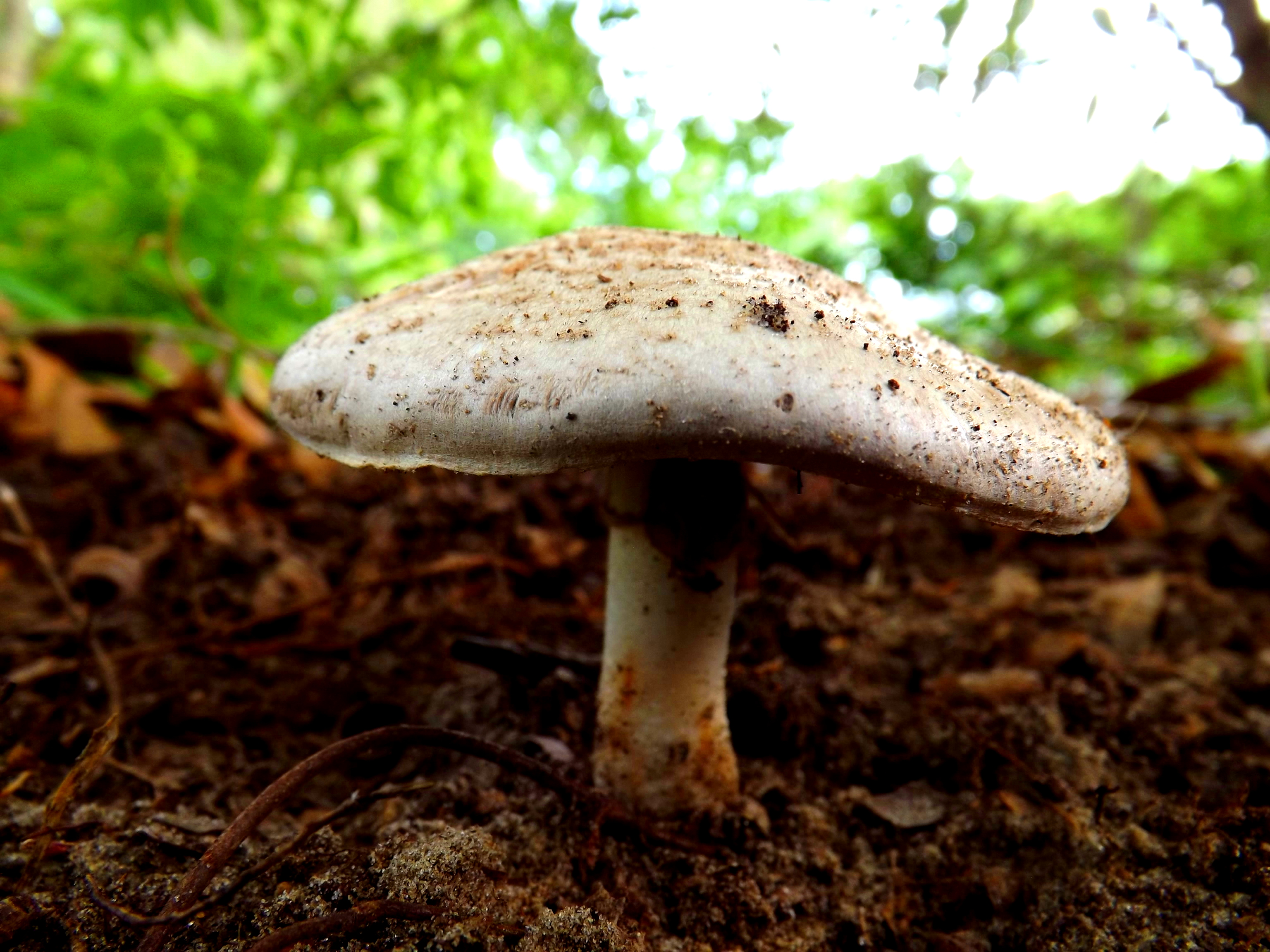

Scientific classification
- Kingdom: Fungi
- Division: Basidiomycota
- Class: Agaricomycetes
- Order: Agaricales
- Family: Agaricaceae
- Genus: Agaricus
- Species: A. alligator

Binomial name
- Agaricus alligator Murrill

= Agaricus alligator =

Species of mushroom

Agaricus alligator is a species of mushroom-forming fungus in the family Agaricaceae. It is endemic to Florida. It was first described in 1945.
