= Agaricus aestivalis =

Scientific classification
- Kingdom: Fungi
- Division: Basidiomycota
- Class: Agaricomycetes
- Order: Agaricales
- Family: Agaricaceae
- Genus: Agaricus
- Species: A. aestivalis

Binomial name
- Agaricus aestivalis Pilát (1951)

Species of fungi

Agaricus aestivalis is a species of mushroom-forming fungus in the genus Agaricus.

== Description ==
The cap averages 5–11 centimetres (2–4 1/2 inches) in diameter. Its color can range from white to pale ocher in mature fungi.

== Distribution and uses ==
The species is found in Germany and edible.
