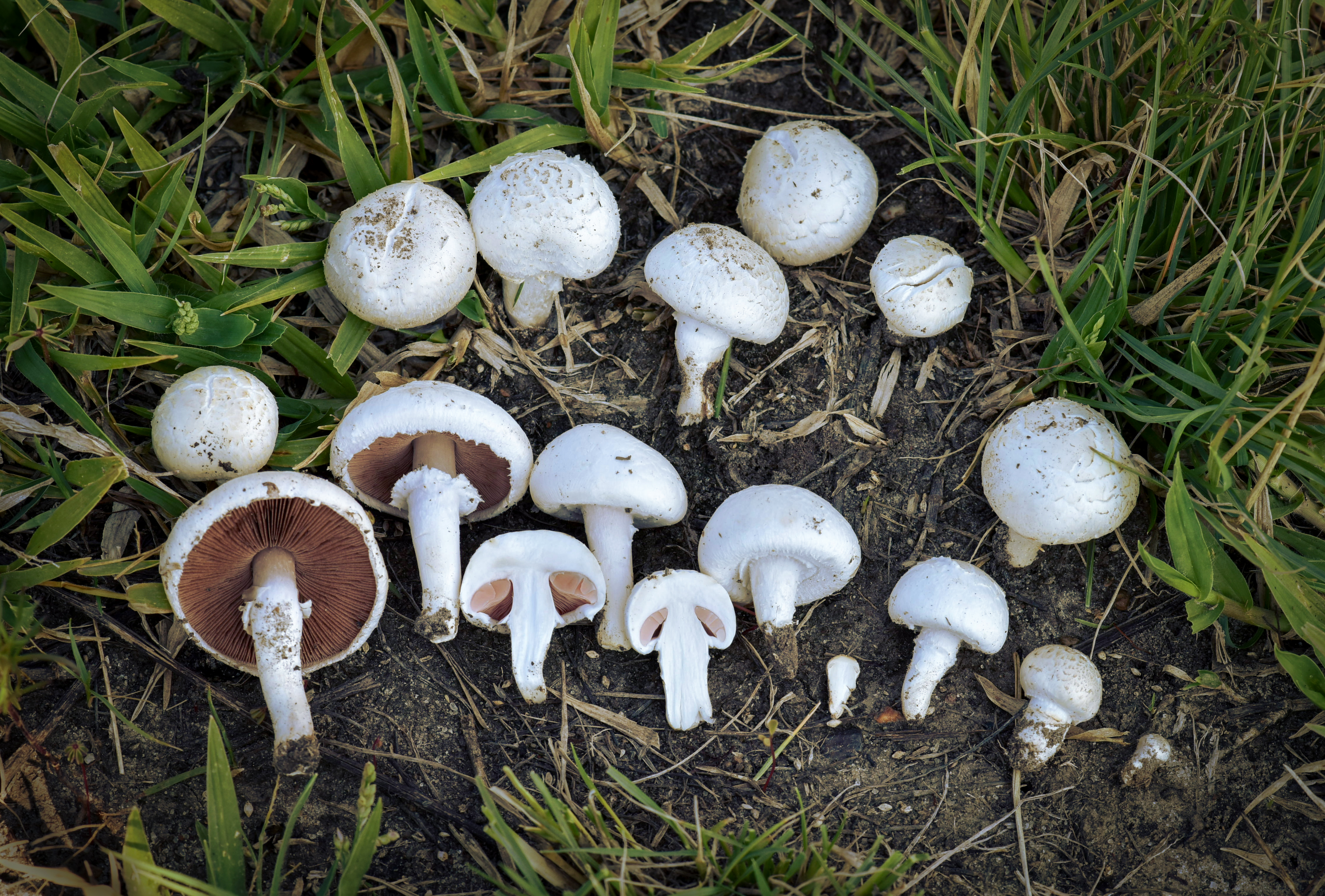
- The type species Agaricus campestris (field or meadow mushroom)

Scientific classification
- Kingdom: Fungi
- Division: Basidiomycota
- Class: Agaricomycetes
- Order: Agaricales
- Family: Agaricaceae
- Genus: Agaricus; L. (1753)

Type species
- Agaricus campestris L. (1753)

Diversity
- >400 species

Synonyms
- Amanita Dill. ex Boehm. (1760); Araneosa; Fungus Tourn. ex Adans. (1763); Hypophyllum Paulet (1808); Longula Zeller (1945); Myces Paulet (1808); Agaricus trib. Psalliota Fr. (1821); Pratella (Pers.) Gray (1821); Psalliota (Fr.) P.Kumm. (1871)

= Agaricus =

Genus of mushrooms

Agaricus
- Mycological characteristics
- Gills on hymenium
- Cap is convex
- Hymenium is free
- Stipe has a ring
- Spore print is brown
- Ecology is saprotrophic

Agaricus is a genus of mushroom-forming fungi containing both edible and poisonous species, with over 400 members worldwide and possibly again as many disputed or newly discovered species. The genus includes the common ("button") mushroom (A. bisporus) and the field mushroom (A. campestris), the dominant cultivated mushrooms of the West.

== Taxonomy ==
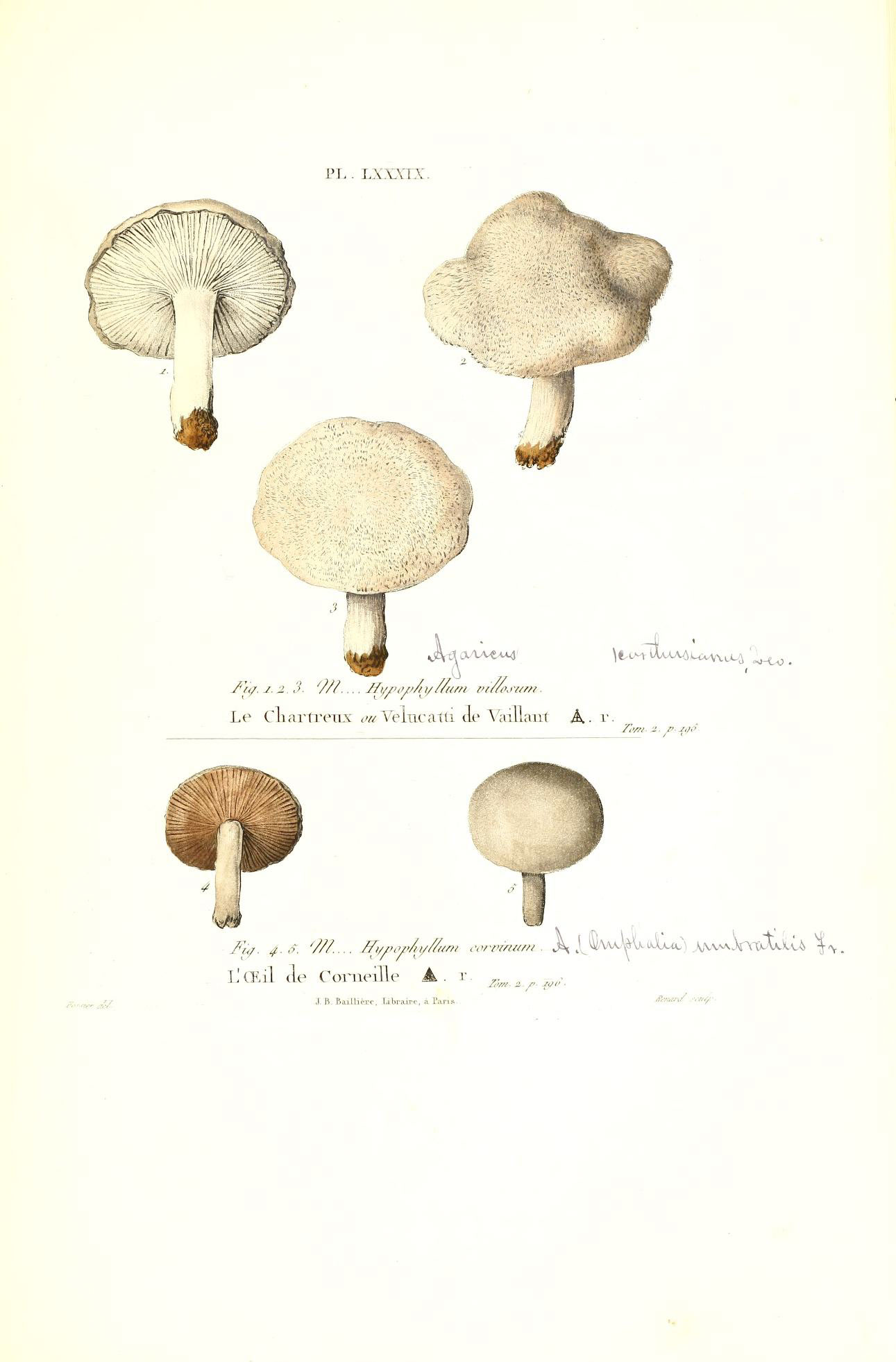
1855 field notes with synonymy of Hypophyllum (quoted literature) with Omphalia and Agaricus (added handwritten notes)

Several origins of genus name Agaricus have been proposed. It possibly originates from ancient Sarmatia Europaea, where people Agari, promontory Agarum and a river Agarus were known (all located on the northern shore of Sea of Azov, probably, near modern Berdiansk in Ukraine).

For many years, members of the genus Agaricus were given the generic name Psalliota, and this can still be seen in older books on mushrooms. All proposals to conserve Agaricus against Psalliota or vice versa have so far been considered superfluous.

Donk reports Carl Linnaeus' name is devalidated (so the proper author citation apparently is "L. per Fr., 1821") because Agaricus was not linked to Tournefort's name. Linnaeus places both Agaricus Dill. and Amanita Dill. in synonymy, but truly a replacement for Amanita Dill., which would require A. quercinus, not A. campestris be the type. This question is compounded because Elias Magnus Fries himself used Agaricus roughly in Linnaeus' sense (which leads to issues with Amanita), and A. campestris was eventually excluded from Agaricus by Karsten and was apparently in Lepiota at the time Donk wrote this, commenting that a type conservation might become necessary.

The alternate name for the genus, Psalliota, derived from the Greek psalion/ψάλιον, "ring", was first published by Fries (1821) as trib. Psalliota. The type is Agaricus campestris (widely accepted, except by Earle, who proposed A. cretaceus). Paul Kummer (not Quélet, who merely excluded Stropharia) was the first to elevate the tribe to a genus. Psalliota was the tribe containing the type of Agaricus, so when separated, it should have caused the rest of the genus to be renamed, but this is not what happened.

=== Phylogeny ===
The use of phylogenetic analysis to determine evolutionary relationships amongst Agaricus species has increased the understanding of this taxonomically difficult genus, although much work remains to be done to fully delineate infrageneric relationships. Prior to these analyses, the genus Agaricus, as circumscribed by Rolf Singer, was divided into 42 species grouped into five sections based on reactions of mushroom tissue to air or various chemical reagents, as well as subtle differences in mushroom morphology. Restriction fragment length polymorphism analysis demonstrated this classification scheme needed revision.

== Subdivisions ==
As of 2018, this genus is divided into 6 subgenera and more than 20 sections:

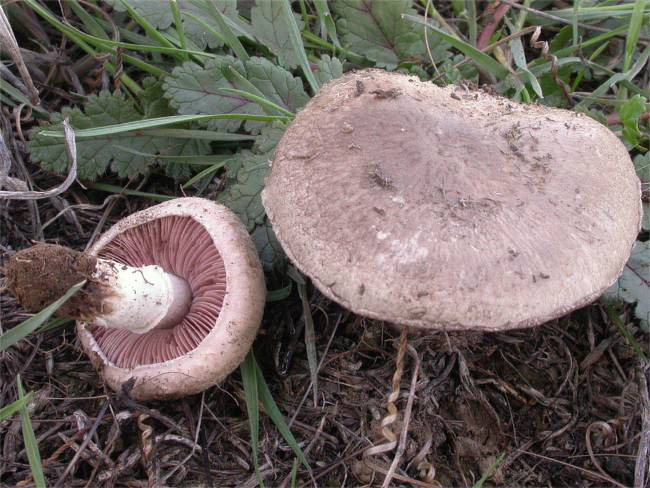
Brown field mushroom, A. cupreobrunneus (Jul.Schäff. & Steer 1939) Pilát 1951

Subgenus Agaricus

- Section Agaricus

This is the group around the type species of the genus, the popular edible A. campestris which is common across the Holarctic temperate zone, and has been introduced to some other regions. One of the more ancient lineages of the genus, it contains species typically found in open grassland such as A. cupreobrunneus, and it also includes at least one undescribed species. Their cap surface is whitish to pale reddish-brown and smooth to slightly fibrous, the flesh usually without characteristic smell, fairly soft, whitish, and remaining so after injury, application of KOH, or Schäffer's test (aniline and HNO_{3}). A. annae may also belong here, as might A. porphyrocephalus, but the flesh of the latter blushes red when bruised or cut, and it has an unpleasant smell of rotten fish when old; these traits are generally associated with subgenus Pseudochitonia, in particular section Chitonioides. The A. bresadolanus/radicatus/romagnesii group which may be one or several species is sometimes placed here, but may be quite distinct and belong to subgenus Spissicaules.

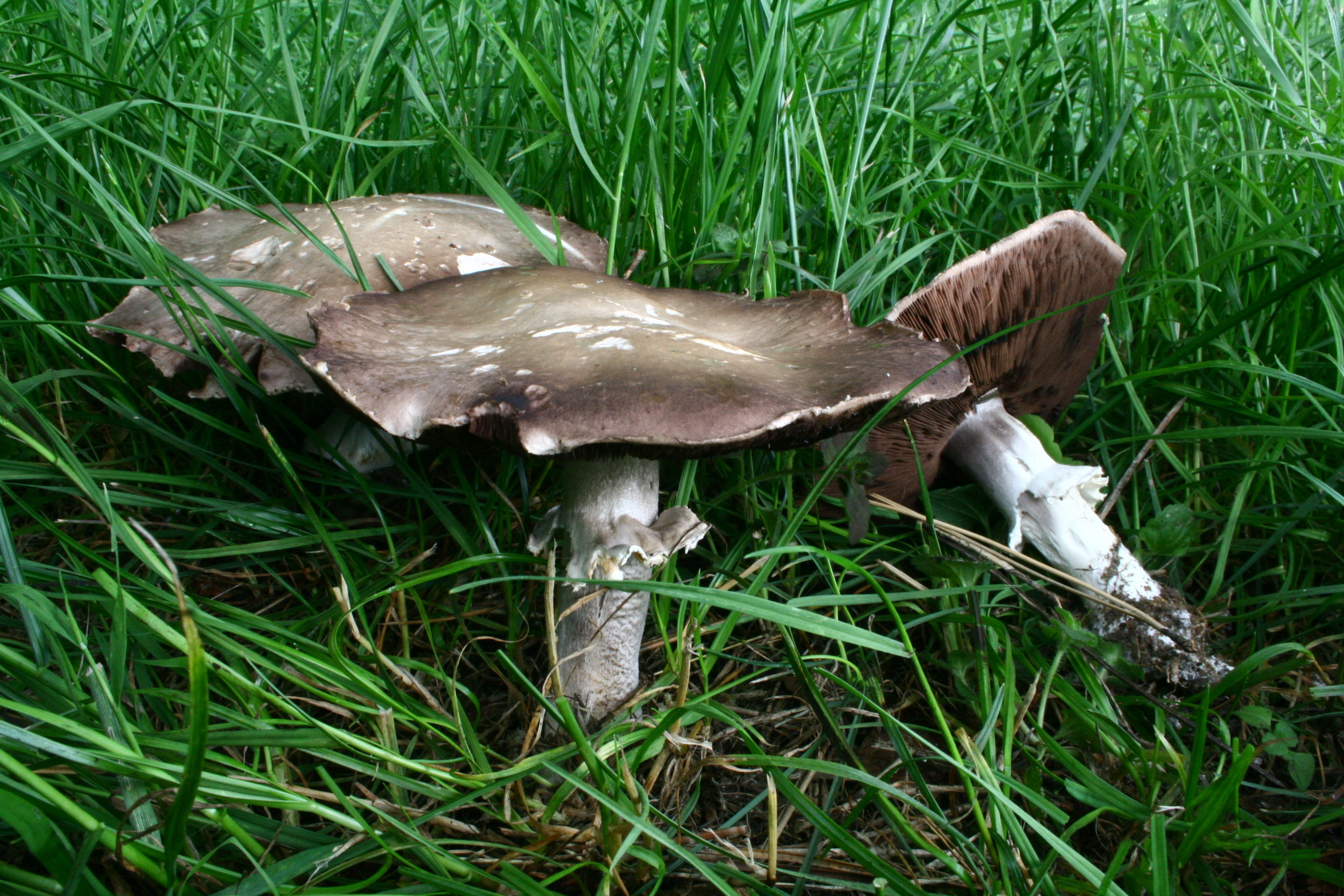
Agaricus osecanus Pilát 1951

Subgenus Flavoagaricus

- Section Arvenses Konrad & Maubl. (sometimes named Arvensis)

Traditionally contained about 20 rather large species similar to the horse mushroom A. arvensis in six subgroups. Today, several additional species are recognized – in particular in the A. arvensis species complex – and placed here, such as A. aestivalis, A. augustus, A. caroli, A. chionodermus, A. deserticola (formerly Longula texensis), A. fissuratus, A. inapertus (formerly Endoptychum depressum), A. macrocarpus, A. nivescens, A. osecanus, A. silvicola and the doubtfully distinct A. essettei, A. urinascens, and the disputed taxa A. abruptibulbus, A. albertii, A. altipes, A. albolutescens, A. brunneolus, A. excellens and A. macrosporus. It also includes A. subrufescens which started to be widely grown and traded under various obsolete and newly-invented names in the early 21st century, as well as the Floridan A. blazei with which the Brazilian A. subrufescens was often confused in the past. They have versatile heterothallic life cycles, are found in a variety of often rather arid habitats, and typically have a smooth white to scaly light brown cap. The flesh, when bruised, usually turns distinctly yellow to pinkish in particular on the cap, while the end of the stalk may remain white; a marked yellow stain is caused by applying KOH. Their sweetish smell of almond extract or marzipan due to benzaldehyde and derived compounds distinguishes them from the section Xanthodermatei, as does a bright dark-orange to brownish-red coloration in Schäffer's test. Many members of this subgenus are highly regarded as food, and even medically beneficial, but at least some are known to accumulate cadmium and other highly toxic chemicals from the environment, and may not always be safe to eat.

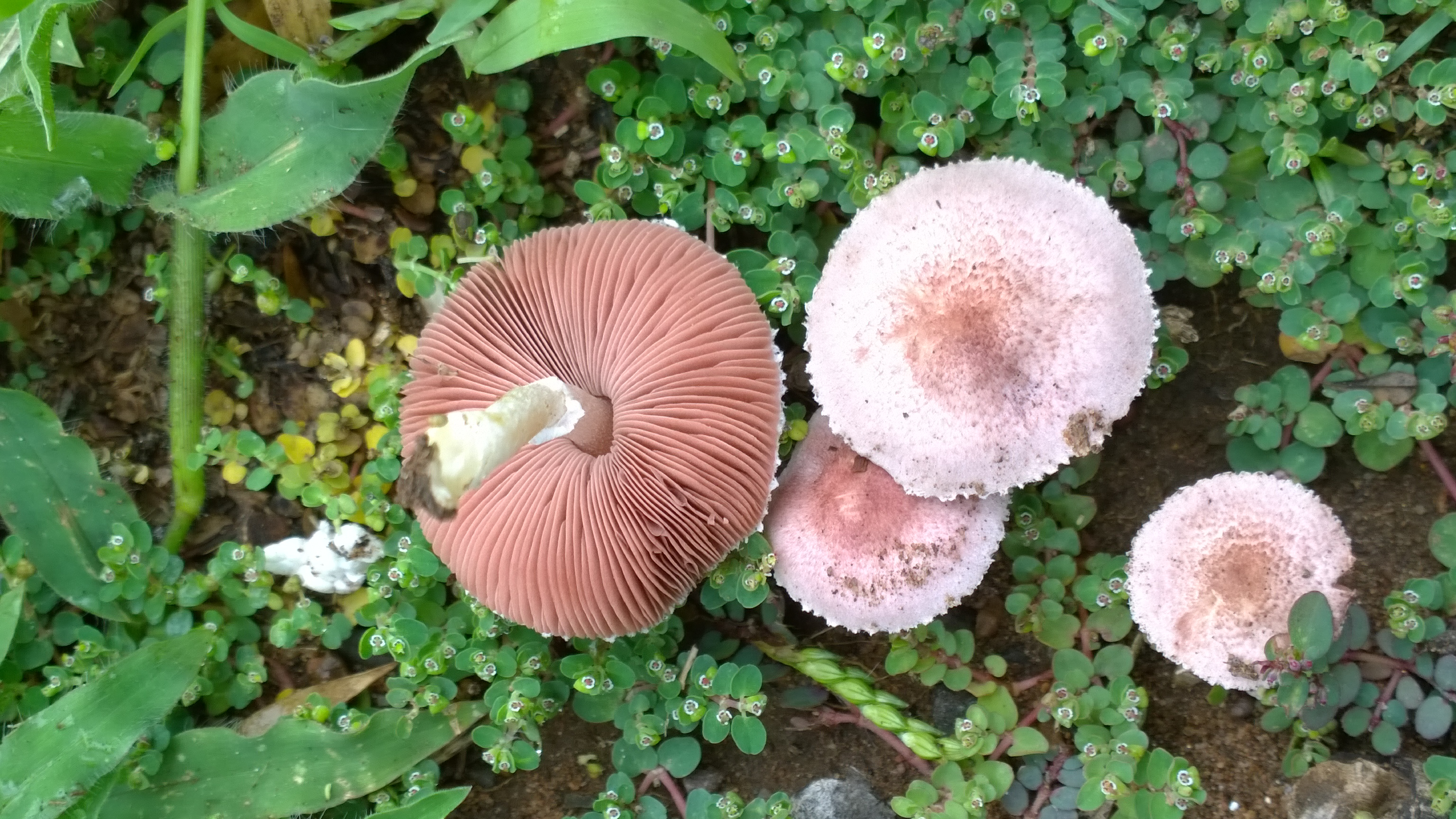
Agaricus diminutivus Peck 1873

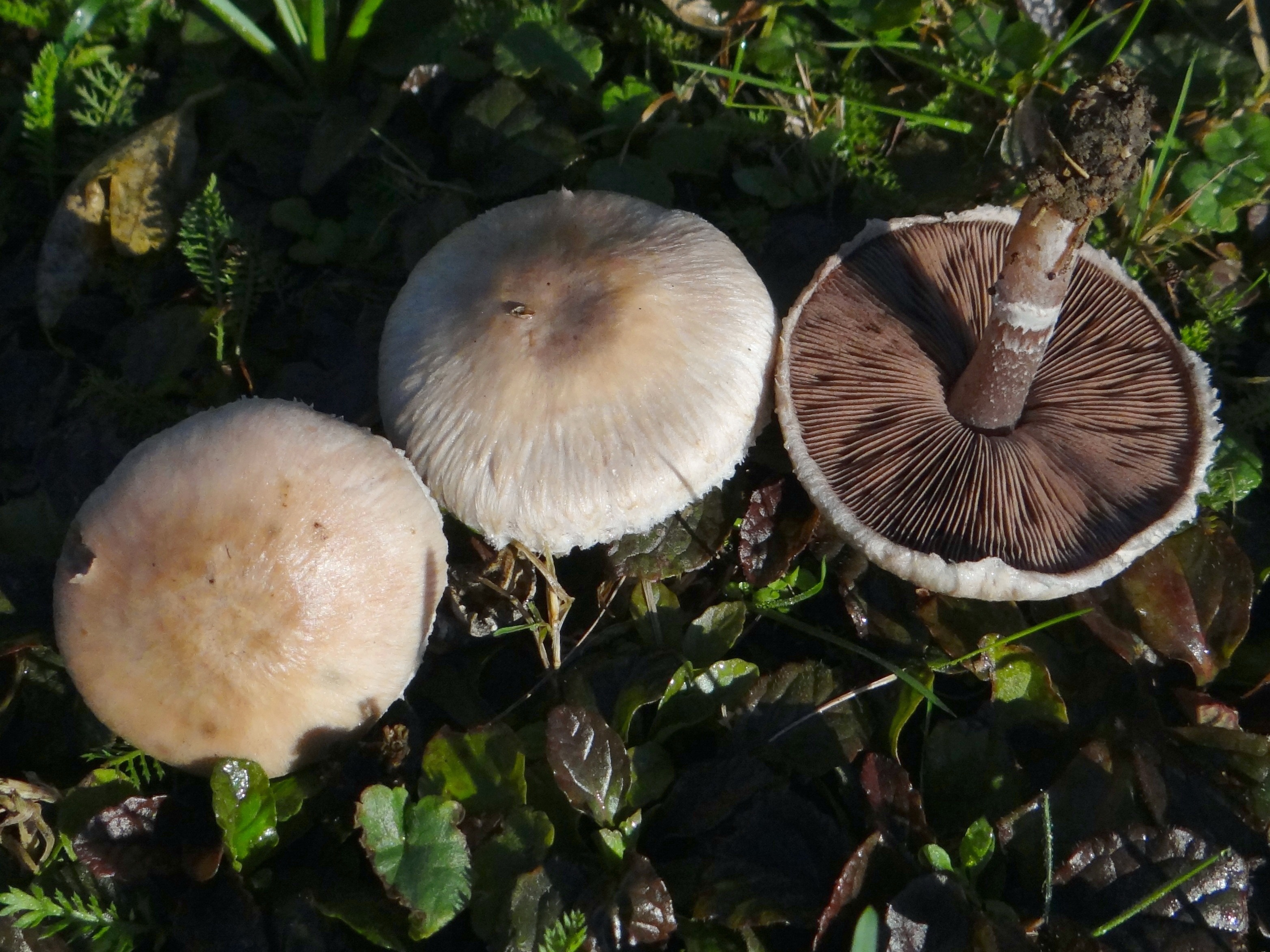
Agaricus comtulus Fr. 1836/1838

Subgenus Minores

A group of buff-white to reddish-brown species. Often delicate and slender, the typical members of this subgenus do not resemble the larger Agaricus species at a casual glance, but have the same telltale chocolate-brown gills at spore maturity. Their flesh has a barely noticeable to pronounced sweetish smell, typically almond-like, turns yellowish to brownish-red when cut or bruised at least in the lower stalk, yellow to orange with KOH, and orange to red in Schäffer's test. Species such as A. aridicola (formerly known as Gyrophragmium dunalii), A. colpeteii, A. columellatus (formerly Araneosa columellata), A. diminutivus, A. dulcidulus, A. lamelliperditus, A. luteomaculatus, A. porphyrizon, A. semotus and A. xantholepis are included here, but delimitation to and indeed distinctness from subgenus Flavoagaricus is a long-standing controversy. Unlike these however, subgenus Minores contains no choice edible species, and may even include some slightly poisonous ones; most are simply too small to make collecting them for food worthwhile, and their edibility is unknown.

- Section Leucocarpi

Includes A. leucocarpus.

- Section Minores

Includes A. comtulus and A. huijsmanii.

- Section Pantropicales

Includes A. candidolutescens and an undescribed relative.

Subgenus Minoriopsis

Somewhat reminiscent of subgenus Minores and like it closely related to subgenus Flavoagaricus, it contains species such as A. martinicensis and A. rufoaurantiacus.

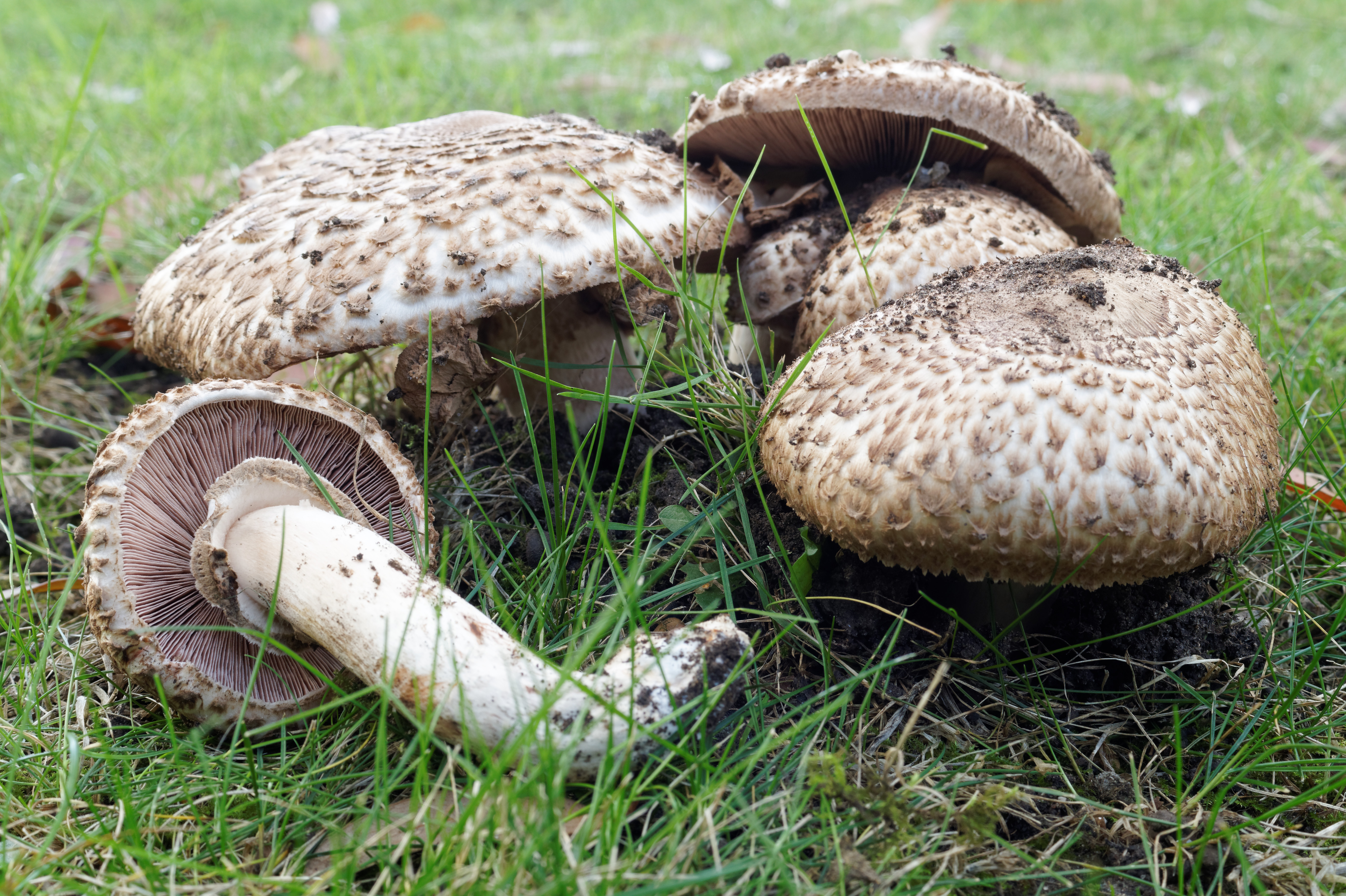
Agaricus bohusii Bon 1983

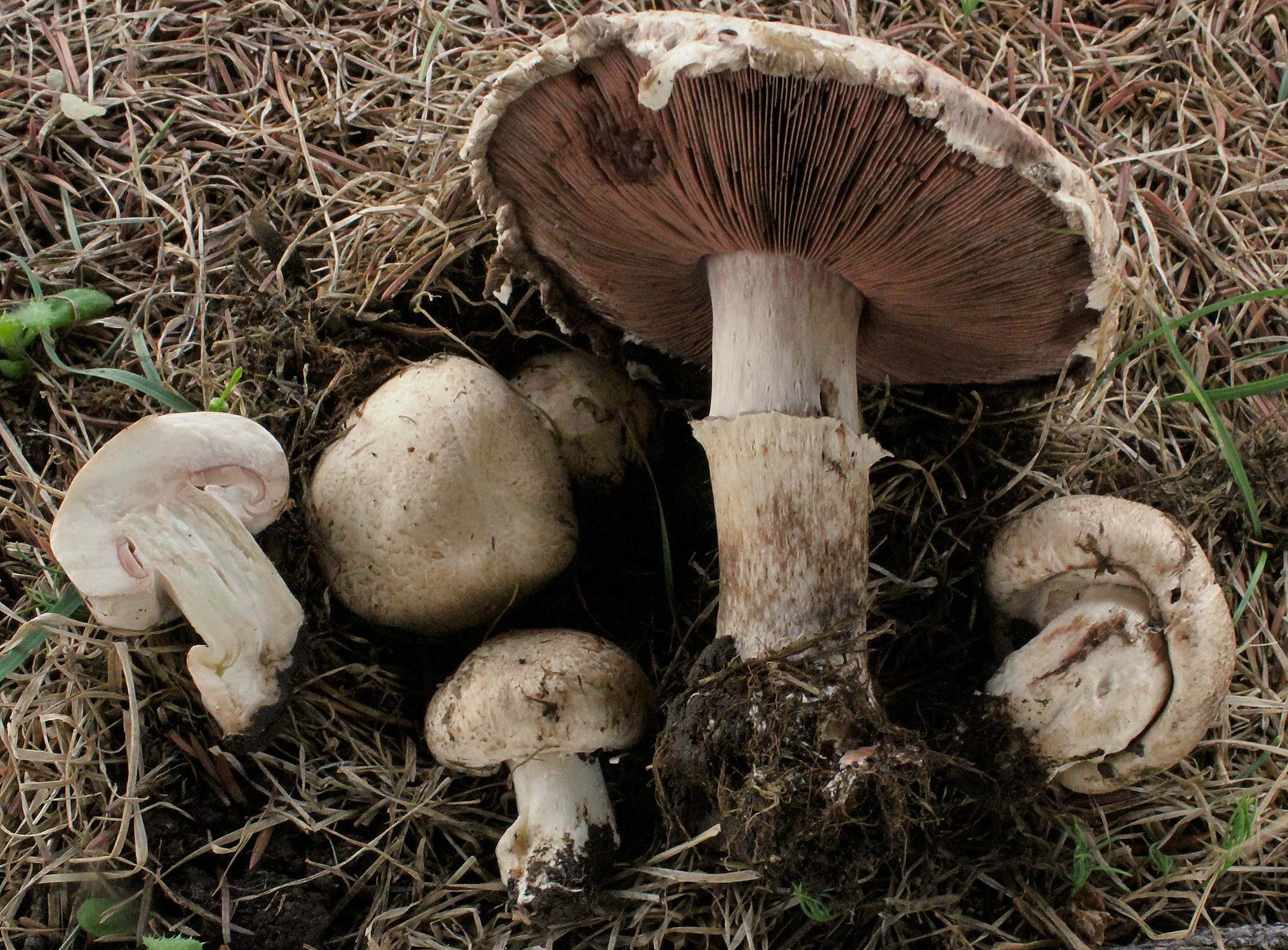
Agaricus subfloccosus(J.E.Lange 1926) Hlaváček/Pilát 1951

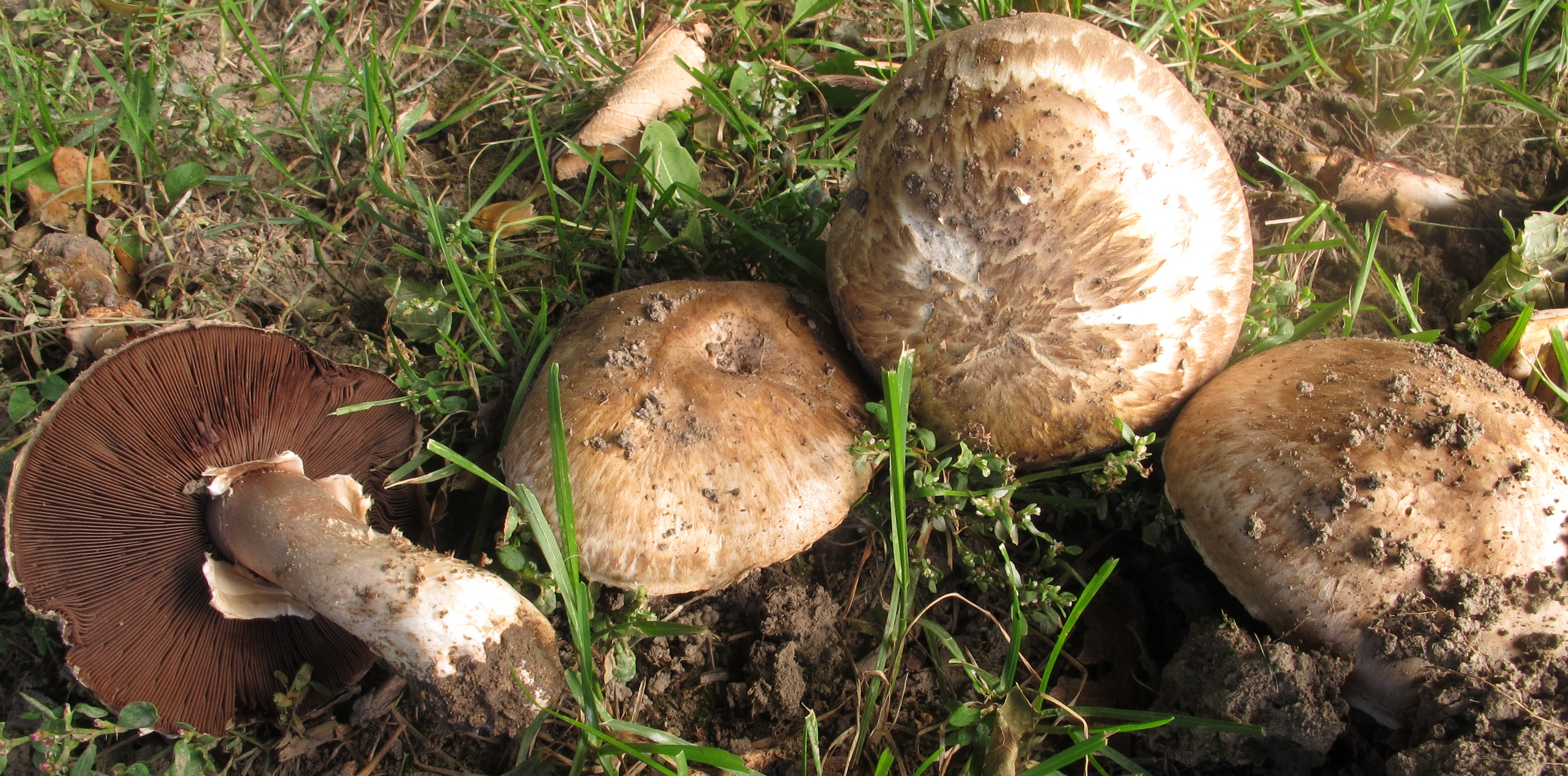
Agaricus cappellianus Hlaváček 1987

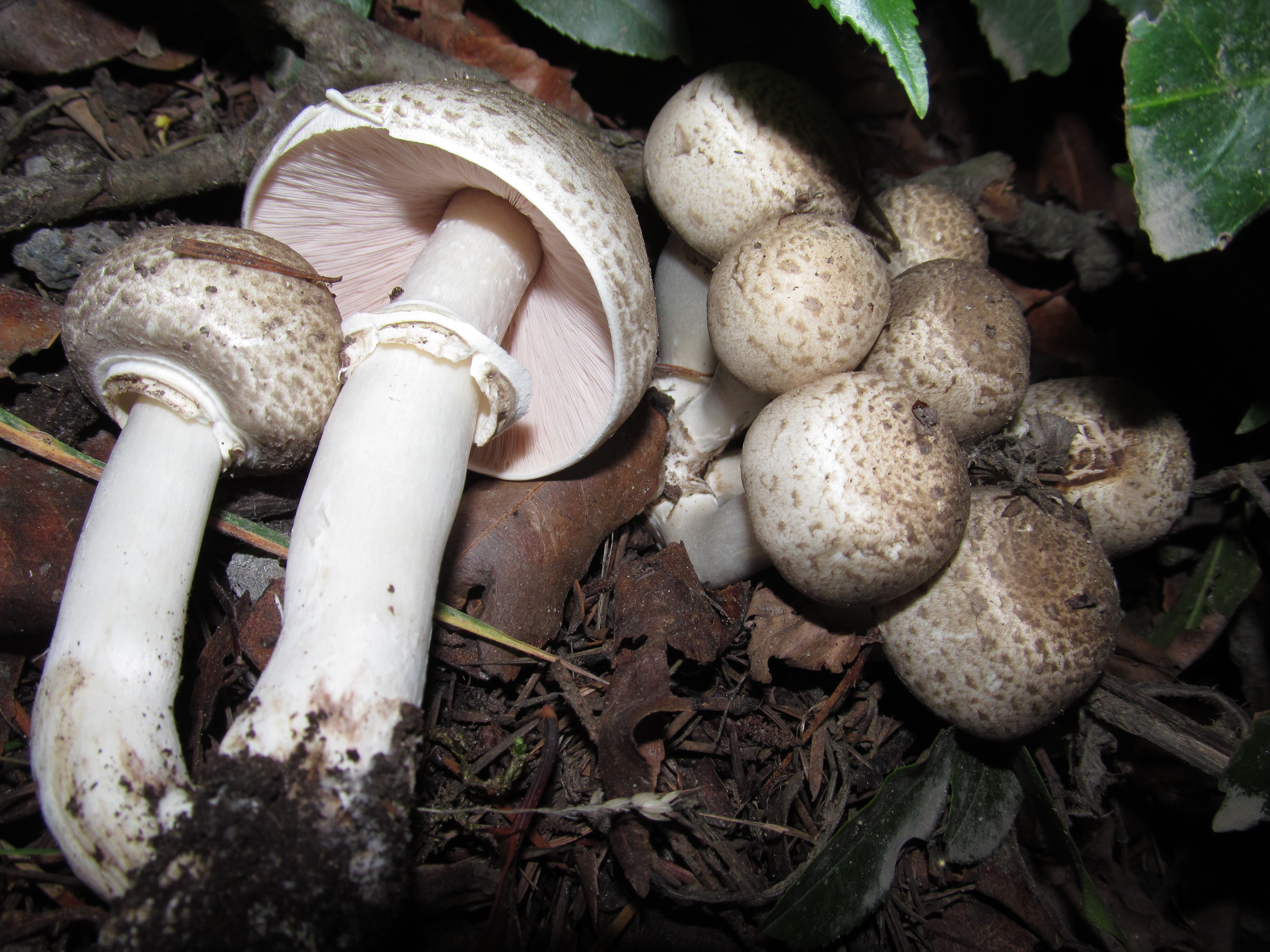
Felt-ringed agaricus, Agaricus hondensis Murrill 1912

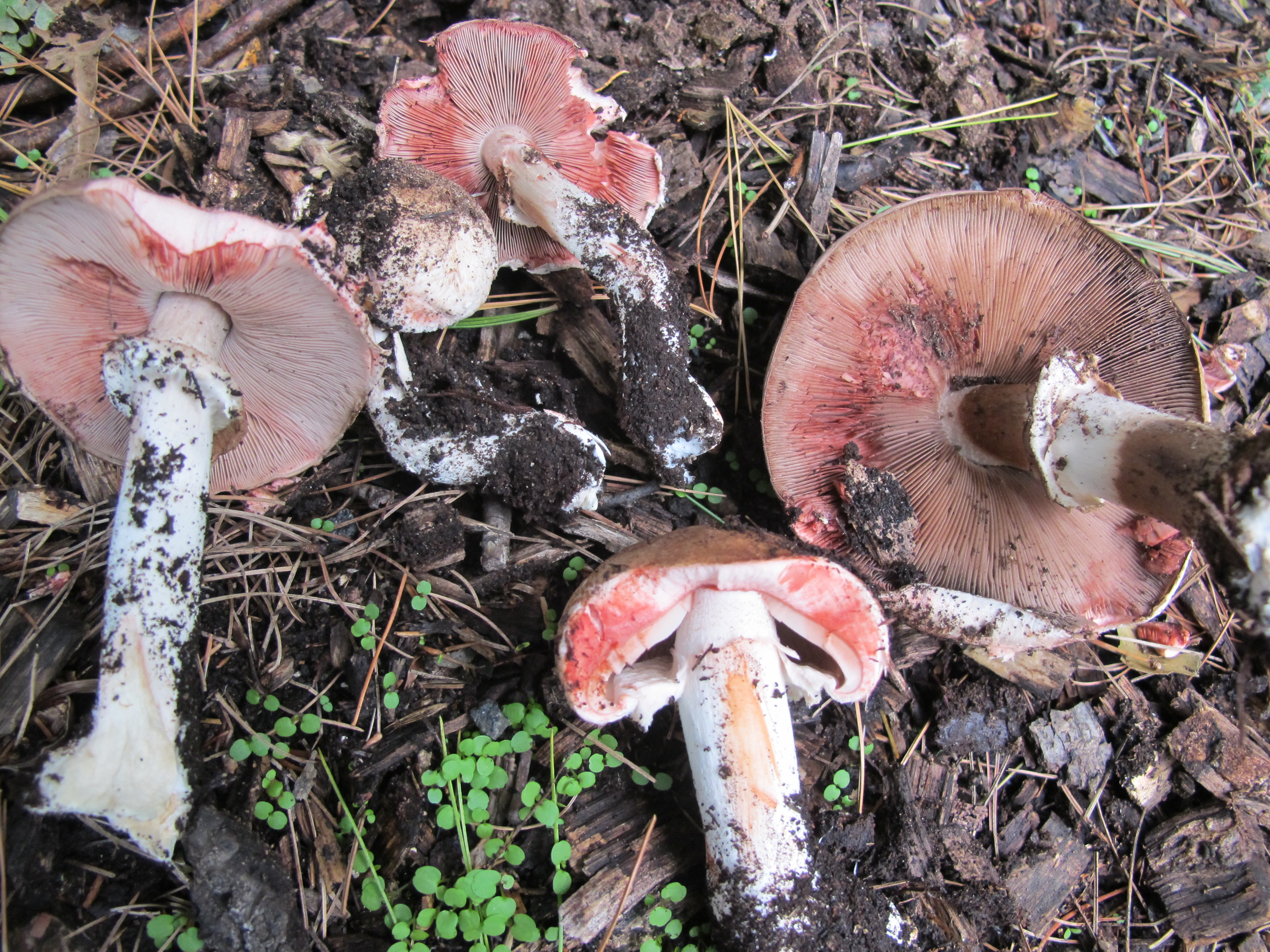
Agaricus pattersoniae Peck 1907

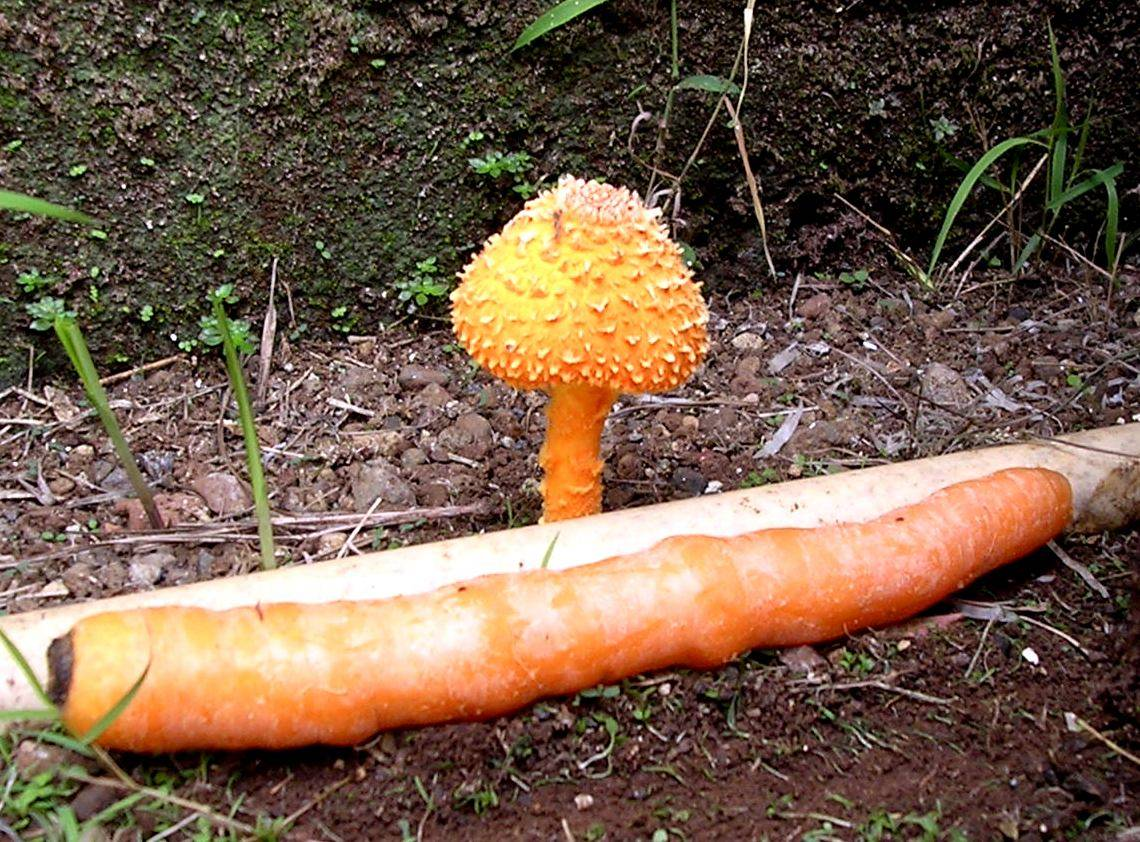
Agaricus trisulphuratus Berk. 1885

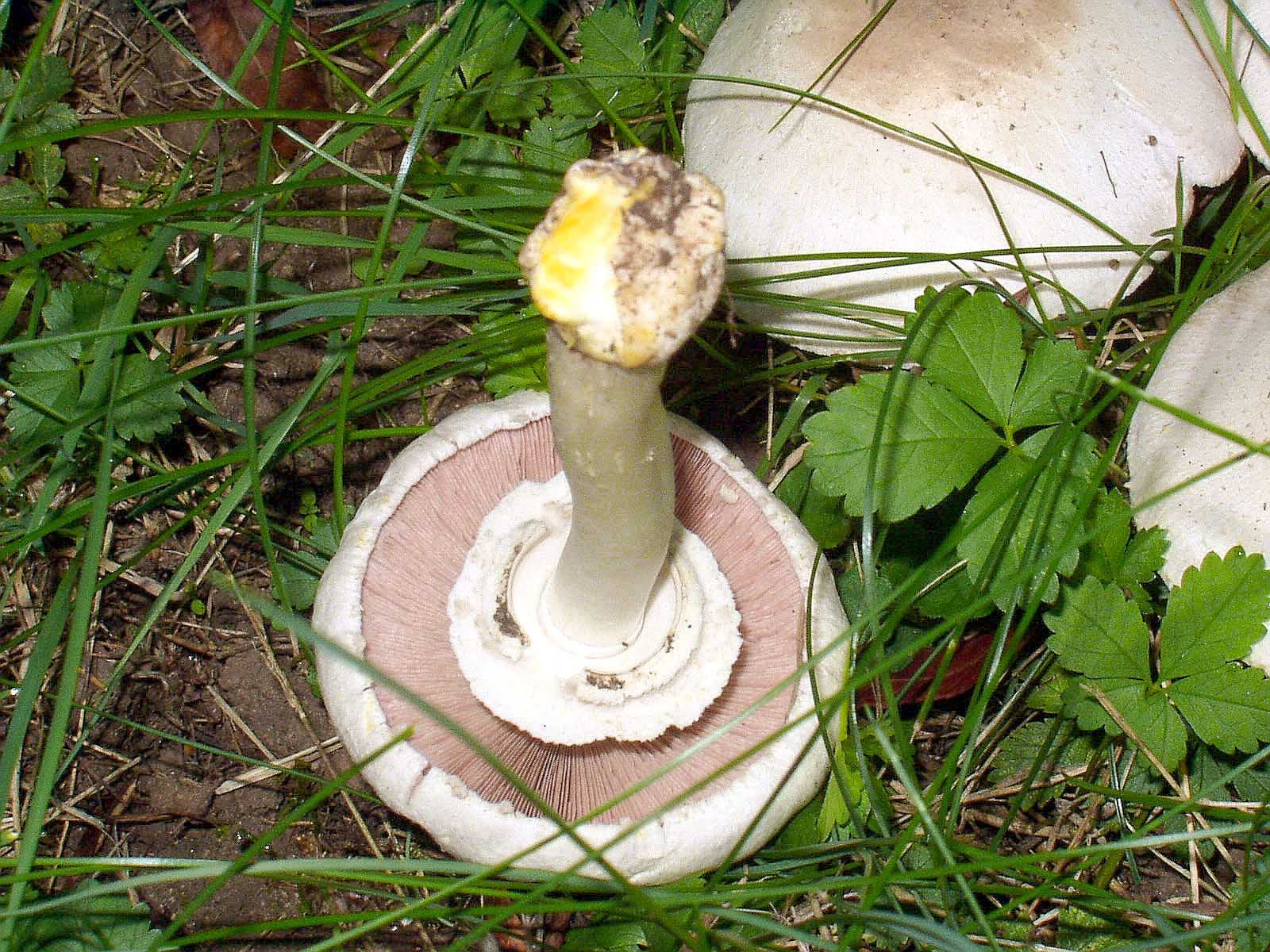
Yellow-staining mushroom, Agaricus xanthodermus Genev. 1876

Subgenus Pseudochitonia

This highly diverse clade of mid-sized to largish species makes up much the bulk of the genus' extant diversity, and this subgenus contains numerous as of yet undescribed species. It includes both the most prized edible as well as the most notoriously poisonous Agaricus, and some of its sections are in overall appearance more similar to the more distantly related Agaricus proper and Flavoagaricus than to their own closest relatives. Some species in this subgenus, such as A. goossensiae and A. rodmanii, are not yet robustly assigned to one of the sections.

- Section Bohusia

Includes A. bohusii which resembles one of the dark-capped Flavoagaricus or Xanthodermatei but does not stain yellow with the standard (10%) KOH testing solution. It is a woodland species, edible when young, but when mature and easily distinguished from similar species it may be slightly poisonous. Other members of this section include A. crassisquamosus, A. haematinus, and A. pseudolangei.

- Section Brunneopicti

A section notable for containing a considerable number of undescribed species in addition to A. bingensis, A. brunneopictus, A. brunneosquamulosus, A. chiangmaiensis, A. duplocingulatus, A. megacystidiatus, A. niveogranulatus, A. sordidocarpus, A. subsaharianus, and A. toluenolens.

- Section Chitonioides

Contains species such as A. bernardii and the doubtfully distinct A. bernardiiformis, A. gennadii, A. nevoi, A. pequinii, A. pilosporus and A. rollanii, which strongly resemble the members of section Duploannulatae and are as widely distributed. However, their flesh tends to discolor more strongly red when bruised or cut, with the discoloration slowly getting stronger. Their smell is usually also more pronounced umami-like, in some even intensely so. Some are edible and indeed considered especially well-tasting, while the unusual A. maleolens which may also belong here has an overpowering aroma which renders it inedible except perhaps in small amounts as a vegan fish sauce substitute.

- Section Crassispori

Related to section Xanthodermatei as traditionally circumscribed, it includes such species as A. campestroides, A. lamellidistans, and A. variicystis.

- Section Cymbiformes He, Chuankid, Hyde, Cheewangkoon & Zhao

A section proposed in 2018, it is closely related to the traditional section Xanthodermatei. The type species A. angusticystidiatus from Thailand is a smallish beige Agaricus with characteristic boat-shaped basidiospores. It has a strong unpleasant smell like members of section Xanthodermatei, but unlike these, its flesh does not change color when bruised, but turns dark reddish-brown when cut, and neither application of KOH nor Schäffer's test elicit a change in color.

- Section Duploannulatae (also known as section Bivelares or Hortenses)

Traditionally often included in section Agaricus as subsection Bitorques, it seems to belong to a much younger radiation. It unites robust species, usually with a thick, almost fleshy ring, which inhabit diverse but often nutrient-rich locations. Some are well-known edibles; as they are frequently found along roads and in similar polluted places, they may not be safe to eat if collected from the wild. Their flesh is rather firm, white, with no characteristic smell, in some species turning markedly reddish when bruised or cut (though this may soon fade again), and generally changing color barely if at all after application of KOH or Schäffer's test. Based on DNA analysis of ITS1, ITS2, and 5.8S sequences, the studied species of this section could be divided into six distinct clades, four of which correspond to well-known species from the temperate Northern Hemisphere: A. bisporus, A. bitorquis (and the doubtfully distinct A. edulis), A. cupressicola and A. vaporarius. The other two clades comprise the A. devoniensis (including A. subperonatus) and A. subfloccosus (including A. agrinferus) species complexes. Additional members of this section not included in that study are A. cappellianus, A. cupressophilus, A. subsubensis, A. taeniatus, A. tlaxcalensis, and at least one undescribed species. The cultivated mushrooms traded as A. sinodeliciosus also belong here, though their relationship to the A. devoniensis complex and A. vaporarius is unclear.

- Section Flocculenti

Includes A. erectosquamosus and A. pallidobrunneus; a more distant undescribed relative of these two may also belong in this section.

- Section Hondenses (disputed)

Traditionally included in section Xanthodermatei sensu lato, this clade may be included therein as the most basal branch, or considered a section in its own right. It includes such species as A. biannulatus, A. freirei and its North American relatives A. grandiomyces, A. hondensis, and probably also A. phaeolepidotus. They are very similar to section Xanthodermatei sensu stricto in all aspects, except for a weaker discoloration tending towards reddish rather than chrome yellow when bruised.

- Section Nigrobrunnescentes

Includes A. biberi, A. caballeroi, A. desjardinii, A. erythrosarx, A. fuscovelatus, A. nigrobrunnescens, A. padanus, A. pattersoniae, and probably also A. boisseletii.

- Section Rubricosi

Includes A. dolichopus, A. kunmingensis, A. magnivelaris, A. variabilicolor, and at least two undescribed species.

- Section Sanguinolenti

Usually found in woodland. Brownish cap with a fibrous surface, typically felt-like but sometimes scaly. The fairly soft flesh turns pink, blood-red or orange when cut or scraped, in particular the outer layer of the stalk, but does not change color after application of KOH or Schäffer's test. Some North American species traditionally placed here, such as A. amicosus and A. brunneofibrillosus, do not seem to be closely related to the section's type species A. silvaticus (including A. haemorrhoidarius which is sometimes considered a distinct species), and represent at least a distinct subsection. Other species often placed in this section are A. benesii, A. dilutibrunneus, A. impudicus, A. koelerionensis, A. langei and A. variegans; not all of these may actually belong here. They are generally (though not invariably) regarded as edible and tasty.

- Section Trisulphurati (disputed)

Includes the A. trisulphuratus species complex which is often placed in genus Cystoagaricus, but seems to be a true Agaricus closely related to the traditional section Xanthodermatei. Their stalk is typically bright yellow-orange, quite unlike that of other Agaricus, as is the scaly cap. A. trisulphuratus was the type species of the obsolete polyphyletic subgenus Lanagaricus, whose former species are now placed in various other sections.

- Section Xanthodermatei

As outlined by Singer in 1948, this section includes species with various characteristics similar to the type species A. xanthodermus. The section forms a single clade based on analysis of ITS1+2. They are either bright white all over, or have a cap densely flecked with brownish scales or tufts of fibers. The ring is usually large but thin and veil-like. Most inhabit woodland, and in general they have a more or less pronounced unpleasant smell of phenolic compounds such as hydroquinone. As food, they should all be avoided, because even though they are occasionally reported to be eaten without ill effect, the chemicals they contain give them a acrid, metallic taste, especially when cooked, and are liable to cause severe gastrointestinal upset. Their flesh at least in the lower stalk turns pale yellow to intensely reddish-ochre when bruised or cut; more characteristic however is the a bright yellow reaction with KOH while Schäffer's test is negative. Apart from A. xanthodermus, the core group of this section contains species such as A. atrodiscus, A. californicus, A. endoxanthus and the doubtfully distinct A. rotalis, A. fuscopunctatus, A. iodosmus, A. laskibarii, A. microvolvatulus, A. menieri, A. moelleri, A. murinocephalus, A. parvitigrinus, A. placomyces, A. pocillator, A. pseudopratensis, A. tibetensis, A. tollocanensis, A. tytthocarpus, A. xanthodermulus, A. xanthosarcus, as well as at least 4 undescribed species, and possibly A. cervinifolius and the doubtfully distinct A. infidus. Whether such species as A. bisporiticus, A. nigrogracilis and A. pilatianus are more closely related to the mostly Eurasian core group, or to the more basal lineage here separated as section Hondenses, requires clarification.

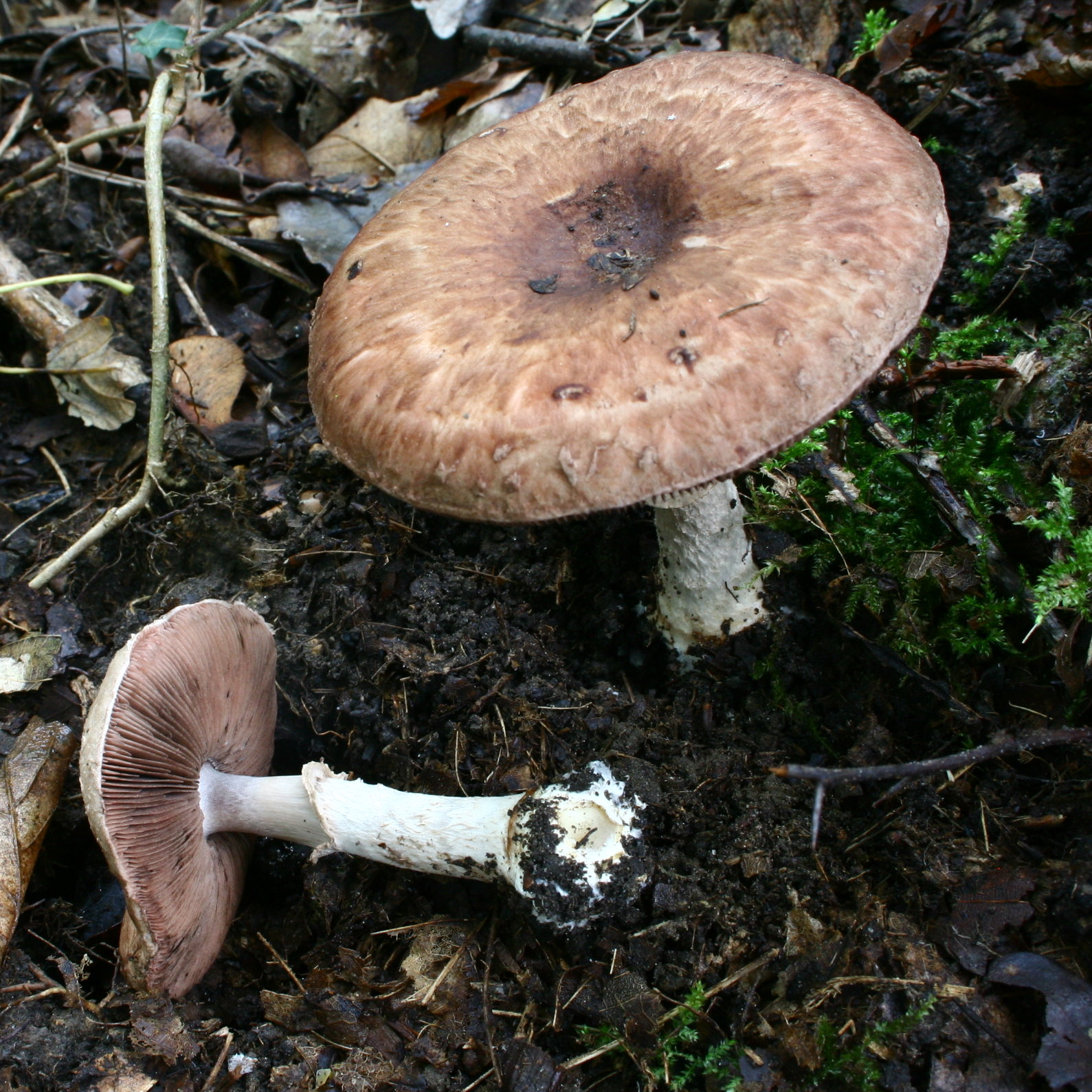
Agaricus lanipes(F.H.Møller & Jul.Schäff. 1938) Hlaváček 1949 ex Pilát/Singer 1951

Subgenus Spissicaules

The flesh of members of this subgenus tends to turn more or less pronouncedly yellowish in the lower stalk, where the skin is often rough and scaly, and reddish in the cap. They typically resemble the darker members of subgenus Flavoagaricus, with a sweet smell and mild taste; like that subgenus, Spissicaules belongs to the smaller of the two main groups of the genus, but they form entirely different branch therein. While some species are held to be edible, others are considered unappetizing or even slightly poisonous. Also includes A. lanipes and A. maskae, which probably belong to section Rarolentes or Spissicaules, and possibly also A. bresadolanus and its doubtfully distinct relatives A. radicatus/romagnesii.

- Section Amoeni

Includes A. amoenus and A. gratolens.

- Section Rarolentes

Includes A. albosquamosus and A. leucolepidotus.

- Section Spissicaules (Hainem.) Kerrigan

Includes species such as A. leucotrichus/litoralis (of which A. spissicaulis is a synonym, but see also Geml et al. 2004) and A. litoraloides. Most significantly, some species have a persistent and unpleasant rotting-wood smell entirely unlike the sweet aroma of Flavoagaricus, and while not known to be poisonous, are certainly unpalatable.

- Section Subrutilescentes

Includes A. brunneopilatus, A. linzhinensis and A. subrutilescens. Somewhat similar to section Sanguinolenti or the dark-capped species of section Xanthodermatei, but the flesh does not show a pronounced red or yellow color change when cut or bruised. Edibility is disputed.

=== Selected species ===
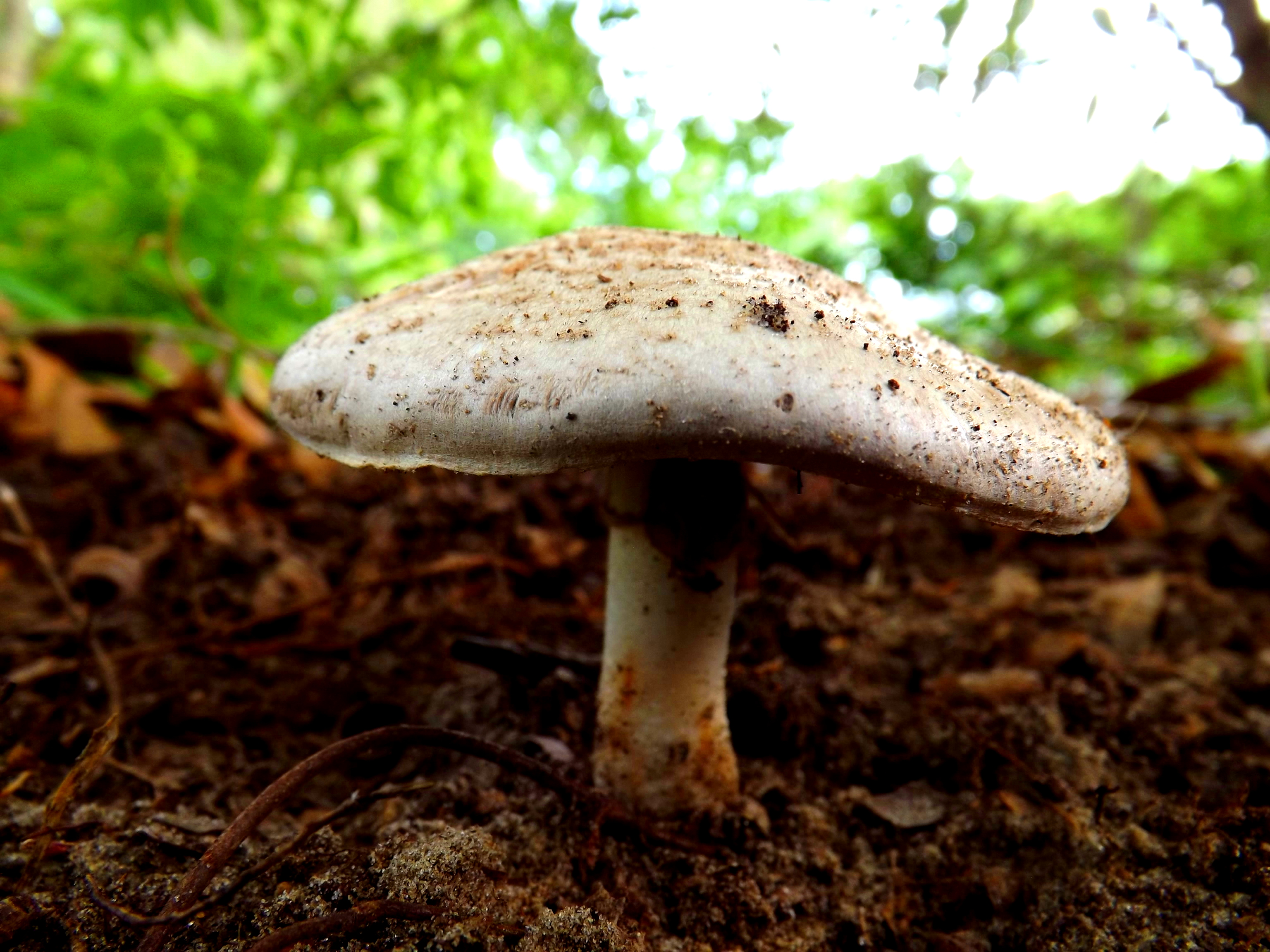
Agaricus alligator Murrill 1945

As late as 2008, Agaricus was believed to contain about 200 species worldwide but since then, molecular phylogenetic studies have revalidated several disputed species, as well as resolved some species complexes, and aided in discovery and description of a wide range of mostly tropical species that were formerly unknown to science. As of 2020, the genus is believed to contain no fewer than 400 species, and possibly many more.

The medicinal mushroom known in Japan as Echigoshirayukidake was initially also thought to be an Agaricus, either a subspecies of Agaricus "blazei" (i.e. A. subrufescens), or a new species. It was eventually identified as sclerotium of the crust-forming bark fungus Ceraceomyces tessulatus, which is not particularly closely related to Agaricus.

Several secotioid (puffball-like) fungi have in recent times be recognized as highly aberrant members of Agaricus, and are now included here. These typically inhabit deserts where few fungi – and even fewer of the familiar cap-and-stalk mushroom shape – grow. Another desert species, A. zelleri, was erroneously placed in the present genus and is now known as Gyrophragmium californicum. In addition, the scientific names Agaricus and – even more so – Psalliota were historically often used as a "wastebasket taxon" for any and all similar mushrooms, regardless of their actual relationships.

Species either confirmed or suspected to belong into this genus include:

- Agaricus abramsii
- Agaricus abruptibulbus – abruptly-bulbous agaricus, flat-bulb mushroom (disputed)
- Agaricus aestivalis
- Agaricus agrinferus (disputed)
- Agaricus alabamensis
- Agaricus albolutescens (disputed)
- Agaricus alligator
- Agaricus amicosus
- Agaricus angusticystidiatus
- Agaricus annae
- Agaricus arorae
- Agaricus arvensis – horse mushroom
- Agaricus augustus – the prince
- Agaricus aurantioviolaceus
- Agaricus benesii
- Agaricus bernardii – salt-loving mushroom
- Agaricus bisporus – cultivated/button/portobello mushroom (includes A.brunnescens)
- Agaricus bitorquis – pavement mushroom, banded agaric
- Agaricus braendlei
- Agaricus bresadolanus
- Agaricus brunneofibrillosus (formerly in A.fuscofibrillosus)
- Agaricus californicus – California agaricus
- Agaricus campestris – field/meadow mushroom
- Agaricus columellatus (formerly in Araneosa)
- Agaricus cupreobrunneus – brown field mushroom
- Agaricus deserticola G.Moreno, Esqueda & Lizárraga (2010) – gasteroid agaricus (formerly in Longula)
- Agaricus dulcidulus – rosy wood mushroom (sometimes in A.semotus)
- Agaricus excellens (disputed)
- Agaricus freirei
- Agaricus hondensis – felt-ringed agaricus
- Agaricus impudicus – tufted wood mushroom
- Agaricus inapertus (formerly in Endoptychum)
- Agaricus julius
- Agaricus lanatoniger
- Agaricus langei (= A.fuscofibrillosus)
- Agaricus lilaceps – giant cypress agaricus
- Agaricus litoralis – coastal mushroom (includes A.spissicaulis)
- Agaricus macrosporus (disputed)
- Agaricus moelleri – inky/dark-scaled mushroom (formerly in A.placomyces, includes A.meleagris)
- Agaricus nebularum
- Agaricus pattersoniae
- Agaricus perobscurus – American princess
- Agaricus phaeolepidotus
- Agaricus pilatianus
- Agaricus placomyces (includes A.praeclaresquamosus)
- Agaricus pocillator
- Agaricus santacatalinensis
- Agaricus semotus
- Agaricus silvaticus – scaly/blushing wood mushroom, pinewood mushroom (= A.sylvaticus, includes A.haemorrhoidarius)
- Agaricus silvicola – wood mushroom (= A.sylvicola)
- Agaricus subrufescens (includes A.rufotegulis, often confused with A.blazei and A.brasiliensis) – almond mushroom, royal sun agaricus, and various fanciful names
- Agaricus subrutilescens – wine-colored agaricus
- Agaricus taeniatus
- Agaricus urinascens
- Agaricus xanthodermus – yellow-staining mushroom

== Description and ecology ==
Members of Agaricus are characterized by having a fleshy cap or pileus, from the underside of which grow a number of radiating plates or gills, on which are produced the naked spores. They are distinguished from other members of their family, Agaricaceae, by their chocolate-brown spores. Members of Agaricus also have a stem or stipe, which elevates it above the object on which the mushroom grows, or substrate, and a partial veil, which protects the developing gills and later forms a ring or annulus on the stalk.

Adults of the pleasing fungus beetle Tritoma biguttata biguttata have been from an unidentified Agaricus species, but this record might refer to some Agaricaceae that is nowadays placed in another genus, and in any case it does not seem to be a regular food source for this beetle.

== Toxicity ==
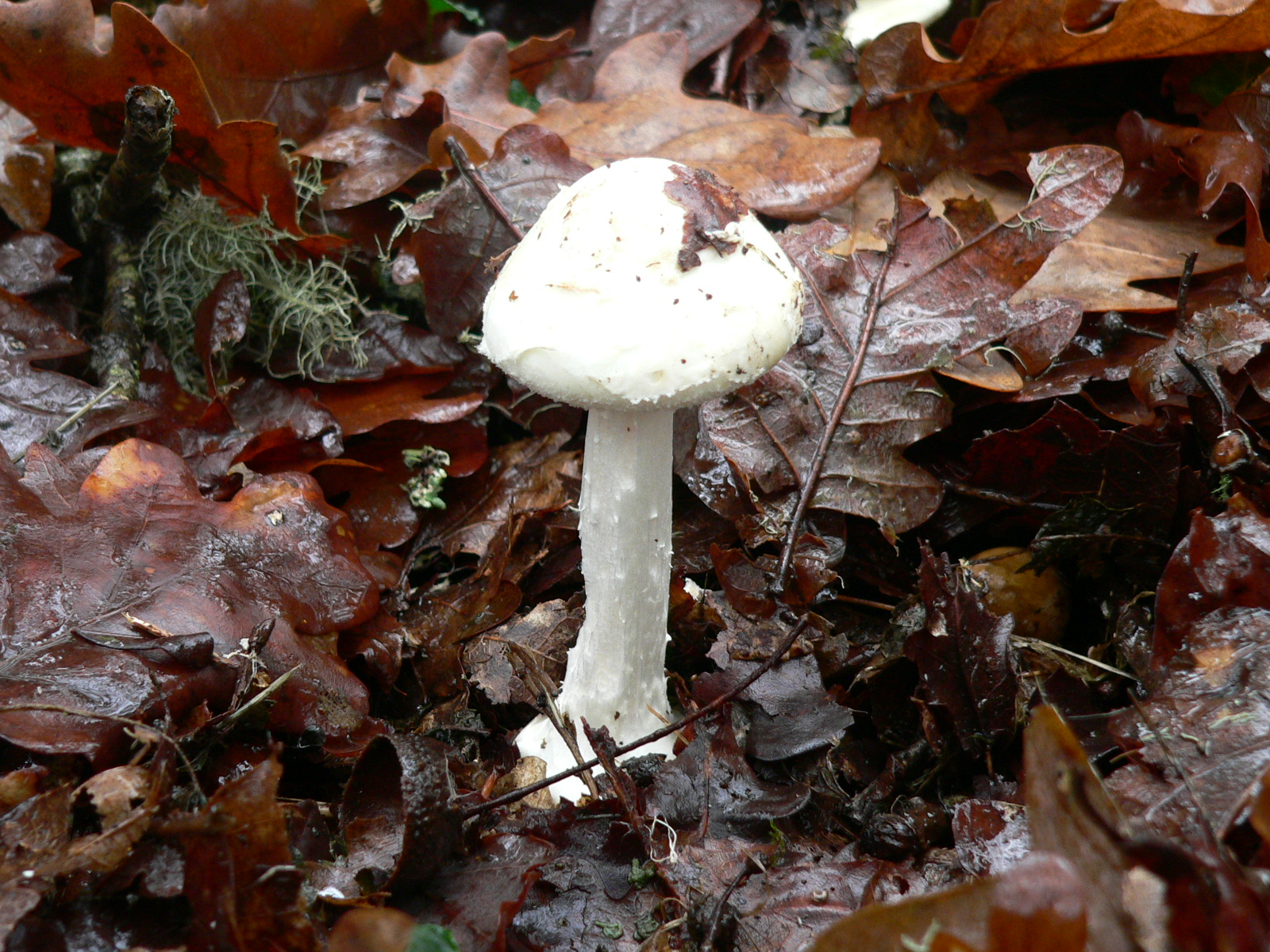
The white form of the death cap Amanita is often mistaken for edible Agaricus, with fatal results

A notable group of poisonous Agaricus is the clade around the yellow-staining mushroom, A. xanthodermus. One species reported from Africa, A. aurantioviolaceus, is reportedly deadly poisonous.

Far more dangerous is the fact that Agaricus, when still young and most valuable for eating, are easily confused with several deadly species of Amanita (in particular the species collectively called "destroying angels", as well as the white form of the appropriately-named "death cap" Amanita phalloides), as well as some other highly poisonous fungi. An easy way to recognize Amanita is the gills, which remain whitish at all times in that genus. In Agaricus, by contrast, the gills are only initially white, turning dull pink as they mature, and eventually the typical chocolate-brown as the spores are released.

Even so, Agaricus should generally be avoided by inexperienced collectors, since other harmful species are not as easily recognized, and clearly recognizable mature Agaricus are often too soft and maggot-infested for eating. When collecting Agaricus for food, it is important to identify every individual specimen with certainty, since eating just one Amanita mushroom cap can cause serious illness.

Reacting to some distributors marketing dried agaricus or agaricus extract to cancer patients, it has been identified by the U.S. Food and Drug Administration as a "fake cancer 'cure'". The species most often sold as such quack cures is A. subrufescens, which is often referred to by the erroneous name "Agaricus Blazei" and advertised by fanciful trade names such as "God's mushroom" or "mushroom of life", but can cause allergic reactions and even liver damage if consumed in excessive amounts.

== Uses ==
The genus contains the most widely consumed and best-known mushroom today, A. bisporus. Other well-known and highly regarded species include A. arvensis, A. augustus, and A. campestris. Agaricus porphyrocephalus is a choice edible when young, while A. subrufescens may be edible in some cases. Many other species are of culinary value, especially within sections Agaricus, Arvense, Duploannulatae and Sanguinolenti.
