= Agaricus taeniatus =

Scientific classification
- Kingdom: Fungi
- Division: Basidiomycota
- Class: Agaricomycetes
- Order: Agaricales
- Family: Agaricaceae
- Genus: Agaricus
- Species: A. taeniatus

Binomial name
- Agaricus taeniatus Sai F.Li, Shao J.Li & H.A.Wen (2014)

Species of fungus

Agaricus taeniatus is a species of agaric fungus. Described as new to science in 2014, it is found in northwest China, where it grows singly or in scattered groups on moss-covered soil in Picea crassifolia forests.

== Taxonomy ==
The type collection was made in Haichaoba, Minle County, China in August 2013 at an altitude of 2,593 m (8,507 ft). Molecular phylogenetic analysis places the fungus in the section Bivelares (subsection Hortenses) of the genus Agaricus. Agaricus subsubensis was the most closely related species of congeners included in the analysis. The specific epithet taeniatus alludes to the partial veil remnants that remain on the surface of the stipe.

== Description ==
The cap shape is initially roughly hemispherical with a flattened top, then expands to become flattened with a wavy margin, with a size range of 6–17 cm (2.4–6.7 in). The cap surface is covered with small brownish scales. The gills are free from attachment to the stipe, and spaced so that there are between 13 and 24 gills per cm at the cap margin. They are initially white, later turning light pink, light brown, and then dark brown after the spores mature. The cylindrical stipe measures 2–6 cm (0.8–2.4 in) long. It has a persistent ring measuring 7–17 mm (0.28–0.67 in) wide. The stipe surface features small, pressed-down scales above the ring, and more fluffy scales below the ring.

Spores are more or less spherical to broadly ellipsoid, and measure 5.7–7.1 by 6.8–8.6 μm. They are thick-walled and smooth, and lack a germ pore.

== Habitat and distribution ==
Agaricus taeniatus is known only from its type locality in Gansu, northwestern China. It fruits scattered or singly on the ground in soil covered in lush moss.

== See also ==
- List of Agaricus species
