= Agaricus columellatus =

Scientific classification
- Domain: Eukaryota
- Kingdom: Fungi
- Division: Basidiomycota
- Class: Agaricomycetes
- Order: Agaricales
- Family: Agaricaceae
- Genus: Agaricus
- Species: A. columellatus

Binomial name
- Agaricus columellatus (Long) R.M.Chapm., V.S.Evenson & S.T.Bates (2016)

Synonyms
- Araneosa columellata Long (1941)

Species of fungus

Agaricus columellatus is a species of secotioid fungus in the family Agaricaceae. The species was described by William Henry Long in 1941. The type collection was made in Arizona, where it was found growing singly on the ground in a grassy area in Mesquite-Catclaw flats. Originally described as the sole member of the monotypic genus Araneosa, in 2016 molecular genetic studies revealed its affinity to the genus Agaricus.

== See also ==
- List of Agaricus species
