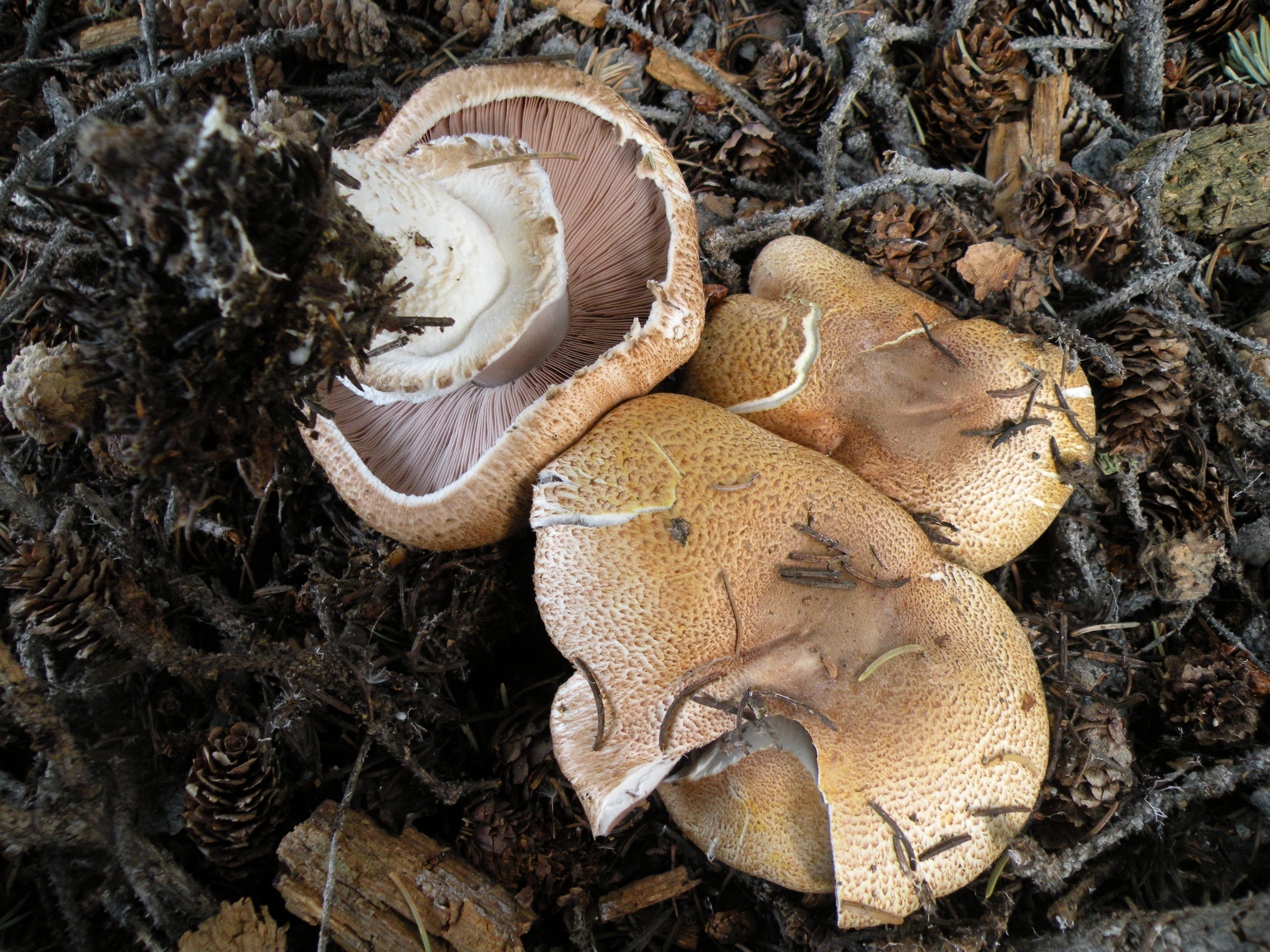

Scientific classification
- Kingdom: Fungi
- Division: Basidiomycota
- Class: Agaricomycetes
- Order: Agaricales
- Family: Agaricaceae
- Genus: Agaricus
- Species: A. amicosus

Binomial name
- Agaricus amicosus Kerrigan (1989)

= Agaricus amicosus =

Species of fungus

Agaricus amicosus
- Mycological characteristics
- Gills on hymenium
- Cap is convex or flat
- Hymenium is free
- Stipe has a ring
- Spore print is brown
- Ecology is saprotrophic
- Edibility is choice

Agaricus amicosus is a species of fungus in the family Agaricaceae.

The mushroom is found in high-elevation forests in the Rocky Mountains, particularly in the Colorado Rockies. It occurs in deep leaf litter under spruce and fir and fruits from late summer to early fall.

The species was formally described by mycologist Richard W. Kerrigan in 1989, from a holotype collected in Grand County, Colorado.

It is considered a choice edible species.

== See also ==
- List of Agaricus species
