= Agaricus litoralis =

Scientific classification
- Domain: Eukaryota
- Kingdom: Fungi
- Division: Basidiomycota
- Class: Agaricomycetes
- Order: Agaricales
- Family: Agaricaceae
- Genus: Agaricus
- Species: A. litoralis

Binomial name
- Agaricus litoralis Wakef. & A. Pearson (1951)

Synonyms
- Psalliota litoralis Wakef. & A. Pearson (1946); Psalliota spissa F. H. Møller (1950); Agaricus spissicaulis F. H. Møller (1950)

Species of fungus

Agaricus litoralis Mycological characteristics
- Gills on hymenium
- Cap is convex or umbilicate
- Stipe has a ring
- Spore print is brown
- Ecology is saprotrophic

Agaricus litoralis, also known as the coastal mushroom, is a species of mushroom in the genus Agaricus. It was first described by Wakefield and A. Pearson as Psalliota litoralis in 1946.

It occurs throughout Europe including Scandinavia and Great Britain. While it may be quite common locally, such as on Öland island, it is rarely found in most areas except for southern Europe. Its conservation status in Sweden is "near threatened".

== Description ==
A. litoralis is a white or grey-white mushroom with a compact cap that may reach a width of up to 12 centimetres (4.7 in). The cap is often depressed when older and rests of the annulus may occur on the outer rim. While rose-coloured at a young age, the gills become dark brown as the mushroom grows older. The stem is 5–6 centimetres (2.0–2.4 in) tall and 1.5–2 centimetres (0.59–0.79 in) wide. It is often remarkably shorter than the cap is wide. The spores are dark brown and egg-shaped. The mushroom is saprotrophic, i.e. it feeds on decaying matter. It prefers herbaceous dry grasslands, heaths and steppe.
