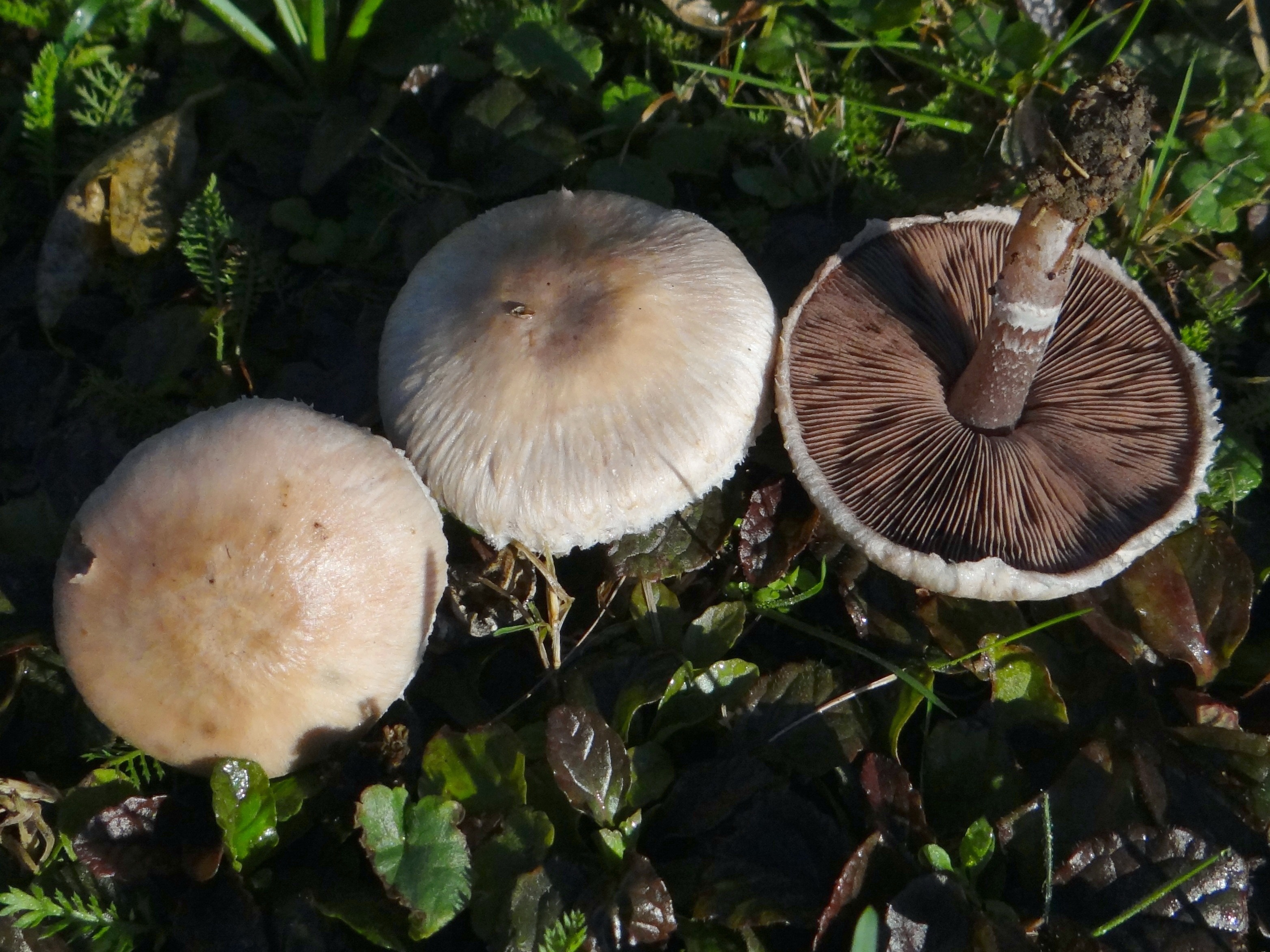

Scientific classification
- Kingdom: Fungi
- Division: Basidiomycota
- Class: Agaricomycetes
- Order: Agaricales
- Family: Agaricaceae
- Genus: Agaricus
- Species: A. comtulus

Binomial name
- Agaricus comtulus Fr. (1838)

= Agaricus comtulus =

Species of fungus

Agaricus comtulus is a species of mushroom described by Swedish mycologist and botanist Elias Magnus Fries in 1838. Its common name in English is ornamented mushroom.
