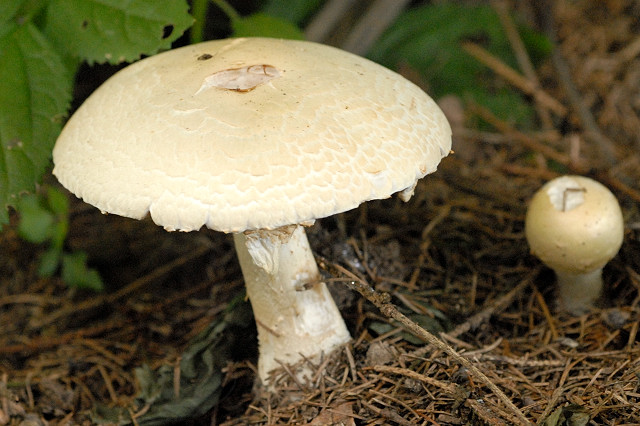

Scientific classification
- Kingdom: Fungi
- Division: Basidiomycota
- Class: Agaricomycetes
- Order: Agaricales
- Family: Agaricaceae
- Genus: Agaricus
- Species: A. excellens

Binomial name
- Agaricus excellens F.H.Møller (1952)

Synonyms
- Scidenweisser egerling; Psalliota excellens (Møller); Agaricus macrosporus subsp. excellens (F.H.Møller) Bohus (1978); Agaricus macrosporus var. excellens (F.H.Møller) Bohus (1990); Agaricus albertii var. excellens (F.H.Møller) Bohus (1990); Agaricus urinascens var. excellens (F.H.Møller) Nauta (2000)

= Agaricus excellens =

Species of mushroom

Agaricus excellens
- Mycological characteristics
- Gills on hymenium
- Cap is convex or flat
- Hymenium is free
- Stipe has a ring
- Spore print is purple-black
- Ecology is saprotrophic
- Edibility is edible

Agaricus excellens (French: Psaliote Excellente, German: Riesen-Egerling) is a rare European mushroom in the genus Agaricus.

== Description ==
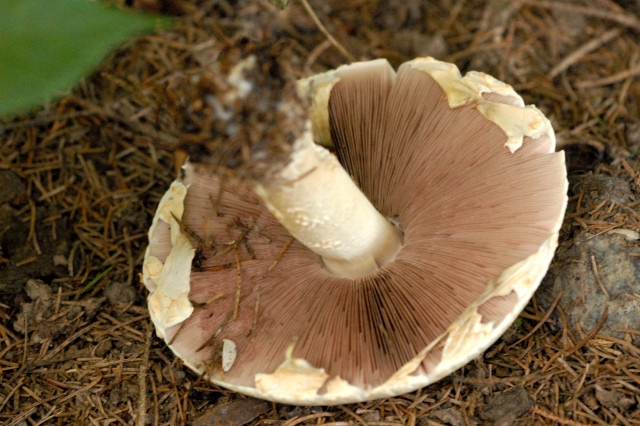
A specimen of A. excellens

- Cap: It is whitish yellow in color. Spread over 10–15 centimetres (4–6 inches) across, it is convex and a bit flat, yellowing slightly at the center especially with age, and densely covered in minute fibrous scales of the same colour. It feels silky.
- Stem / Stipe: Stem is 10–14 cm (4–5 1/2 in) by 2–3.5 cm (1–1 1/2 in), white in color; the ring is thick and white. The underside is scaly or fibrillar.
- Gills: The gills are pale-pink and free.
- Spores and microscopic features: Spore print is purplish black. Spores are elliptic, measuring 9–12 x 5–7 μ.
- Flesh and smell: The cap flesh is reddish-white. It tastes sweet and a bit like mushroom, smells slightly of aniseed and almond.

== Distribution and habitat ==
Native to Europe, the species is found in coniferous and deciduous areas and grows during late autumn to summer amongst grass in open woodland, especially spruce. It is typically found at altitudes of 0 to 914 metres (0 to 3,000 feet).

== See also ==
- List of Agaricus species
