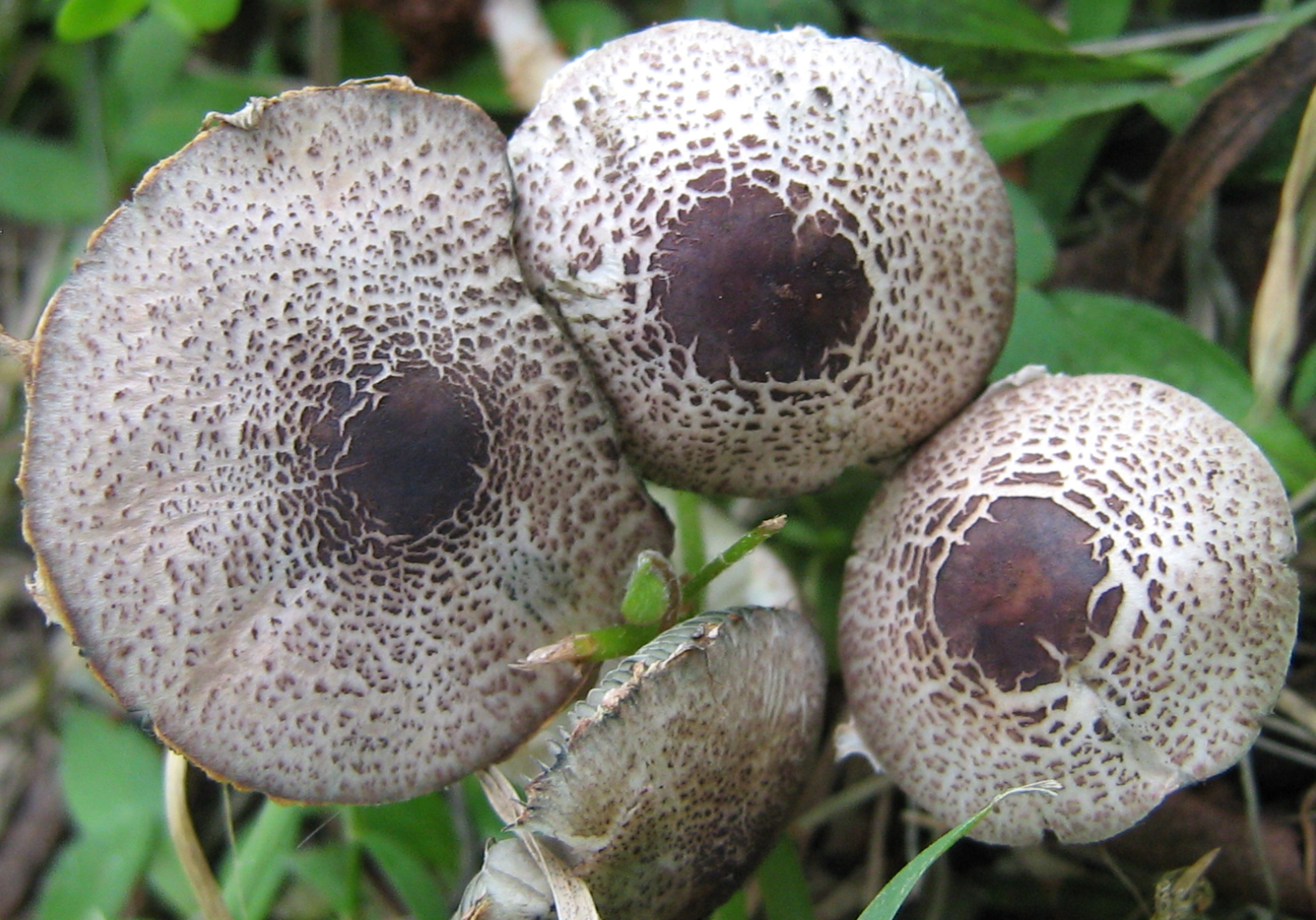
- Unidentified Micropsalliota from South Africa

Scientific classification
- Kingdom: Fungi
- Division: Basidiomycota
- Class: Agaricomycetes
- Order: Agaricales
- Family: Agaricaceae
- Genus: Micropsalliota; Höhn. (1914)

Type species
- Micropsalliota pseudovolvulata Höhn. (1914)

= Micropsalliota =

Genus of fungi

Micropsalliota is a genus of small agaric fungi in the family Agaricaceae. The genus contains about 60 species, most of which are found in tropical areas.

== Taxonomy ==
The genus was circumscribed by Austrian mycologist Franz Xaver Rudolf von Höhnel in 1914 with Micropsalliota pseudovolvulata as the type species. This species was collected in 1907 by Höhnel in the Bogor Botanical Gardens in Bogor, Indonesia. The generic name refers to the similarity of the slender fruitbodies to those in Psalliota (a genus that has since been synonymized with Agaricus). Emendations were made to the genus in 1969 by Pegler and Rayner, and then in 1976 by Heinemann. Molecular phylogenetics has shown that the genus represents a monophyletic lineage in the family Agaricaceae that is sister to the genus Hymenagaricus.

== Description ==
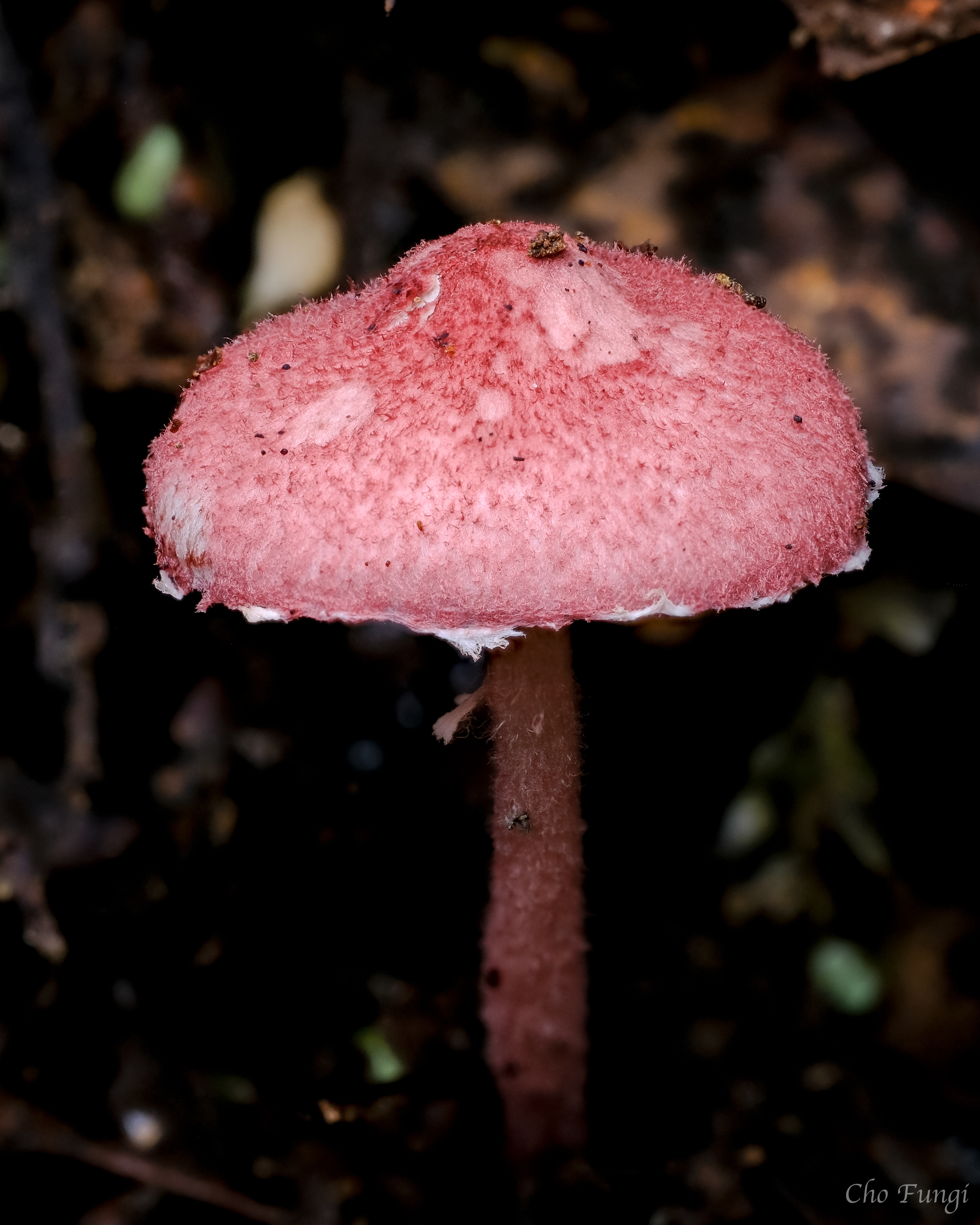
Micropsalliota wuyishanensis from Taiwan.

Micropsalliota fruitbodies have a ring on the stipe, free gill attachment, and brown spores. Micropsalliota is distinguished from similar genera with dark spore prints by its small- to medium-sized fruit bodies, ellipsoid to cymbiform (boat-shaped) basidiospores with an apical thickening in the endosporium, cheilocystidia that are often capitate (ending in a distinct compact head) or nearly so, and pileipellis hyphae encrusted with a pigment that turns olive to green after application of NH_{4}OH.

== Ecology and distribution ==
About 40 Micropsalliota species have been described by Belgian mycologist Paul Heinemann and colleagues from the tropics of Africa, America, India, Indonesia, and Malaysia. Eleven new species from Thailand were added in 2010. Micropsalliota pseudoglobocystis is the first species of the genus reported from China. A new species, Micropsalliota albofelina, was described in 2021; it is the first record of the genus in Vietnam.

== Species ==
As of July 2022, Index Fungorum accepts 70 species of Micropsalliota:

- M. alba Heinem. & Little Flower 1983 – Kerala
- M. albella M.Q. He & R.L. Zhao 2020 – Thailand
- M. albofelina D.D. Ivanova & O.V. Morozova 2021 – Vietnam
- M. albonuda (Beeli) Heinem. 1988 – Kerala
- M. albosericea Heinem. & Leelav. 1991
- M. allantoidea R.L.Zhao, Desjardin, Soytong & K.D.Hyde 2010 – Thailand
- M. arginea (Berk. & Broome) Pegler & R.W.Rayner 1969
- M. arginophaea Heinem. 1980 – Peninsular Malaysia
- M. atropurpurea Heinem. 1988 – Zaire
- M. avellanea Heinem. & Little Flower 1983 – Kerala
- M. bambusicola (Heinem.) Heinem. 1988
- M. bifida R.L.Zhao, Desjardin, Soytong & K.D.Hyde 2010 – Thailand
- M. bogoriensis Heinem. 1983 – Java
- M. brunneola Heinem. 1980 – Peninsular Malaysia
- M. brunneosperma (Singer) Pegler 1969
- M. brunneosquamata Linda J. Chen, R.L. Zhao & K.D. Hyde 2016 – Thailand
- M. campestroides (Heinem. & Gooss.-Font.) Heinem. 1988
- M. cardinalis Heinem. 1989 – Argentina
- M. cephalocystis (Heinem.) Heinem. 1977
- M. cinnamomeopallida Singer 1982 – Costa Rica
- M. cornuta Har. Takah. & Taneyama 2016 – Japan
- M. cortinata (Heinem.) Heinem. 1988
- M. cymbispora Heinem. & Little Flower 1983 – Kerala
- M. cystidiosa Natarajan & Manjula 1982 – Tamil Nadu
- M. delicatula R.L. Zhao, J.X. Li & M.Q. He 2021 – China
- M. dentatomarginata R.L. Zhao, J.X. Li & M.Q. He 2021 – China
- M. digitatocystis R.L. Zhao, J.X. Li & M.Q. He 2021 – China
- M. elata Heinem. 1988 – Senegal
- M. endophaea Heinem. 1988 – Senegal
- M. erythrospila (Berk. & Broome) Pegler 1986
- M. furfuracea R.L. Zhao, Desjardin, Soytong & K.D. Hyde 2010 – Thailand
- M. geesterani (Bas & Heinem.) R.L. Zhao & L.A. Parra 2015 – Netherlands
- M. globocystis Heinem. 1980 – Singapore
- M. gracilis Heinem. 1980 – Singapore
- M. heinemaniana Guzm.-Dáv. 1992 – Mexico
- M. heterocystis Heinem. 1988 – Zaire
- M. ianthina Heinem. 1980 – Singapore
- M. laeta Heinem. 1980 – Singapore
- M. lateritia Heinem. 1980 – Singapore
- M. luteotacta Heinem. 1988 – Zaire
- M. lutescens Heinem. 1980 – Singapore
- M. malabarensis Heinem. & Little Flower 1983 – Kerala
- M. megarubescens R.L.Zhao, Desjardin, Soytong & K.D.Hyde 2010 – Thailand
- M. megaspora R.L.Zhao, Desjardin, Soytong & K.D.Hyde 2010 – Thailand
- M. ochracea Heinem. 1980 – Singapore
- M. pholiotinoides Heinem. 1983 – Zaire
- M. pilicystis Heinem. 1980 – Singapore
- M. pleurocystidiata Heinem. & Little Flower 1983 – Kerala
- M. plumaria (Berk. & Broome) Höhn. 1914
- M. pruinosa Heinem. 1989 – Rio de Janeiro
- M. pseudoarginea Heinem. 1982 – Papua New Guinea
- M. pseudoglobocystis Li Wei & R.L. Zhao 2015 – China
- M. pseudovolvulata Höhn. 1914
- M. pudica Heinem. & Leelav. 1991 – Kerala
- M. pulverulenta Heinem. & Leelav. 1991 – Kerala
- M. purpurea Singer 1977 – Ecuador
- M. purpureobrunneola M.Q. He & R.L. Zhao 2020 – Thailand
- M. pusillissima R.L.Zhao, Desjardin, Soytong & K.D.Hyde 2010 – Thailand
- M. repanda Heinem. 1980 – Singapore
- M. roseipes Heinem. 1980 – Peninsular Malaysia
- M. roseovinaceus Pegler 1982 – Martinique
- M. rubrobrunnescens R.L.Zhao, Desjardin, Soytong & K.D.Hyde 2010 – Thailand
- M. subalba Heinem. & Little Flower 1983 – Kerala
- M. subalpina Guzm.-Dáv. & Heinem. 1994 – Mexico
- M. subarginea Heinem. 1980 – Singapore
- M. suthepensis R.L.Zhao, Desjardin, Soytong & K.D. Hyde 2010 – Thailand
- M. ventricocystidiata Al-Sadi & S. Hussain 2022 – Oman
- M. vinaceoumbrina (A.H.Sm.) Heinem. 1977 – Texas
- M. violaceosquamulosa (R.E.D.Baker & W.T.Dale) Heinem. 1980 – Trinidad-Tobago
- M. xanthorubescens Heinem. 1980 – Singapore
- M. wuyishanensis J.Q. Yan 2022

== See also ==
- List of Agaricales genera
- List of Agaricaceae genera
