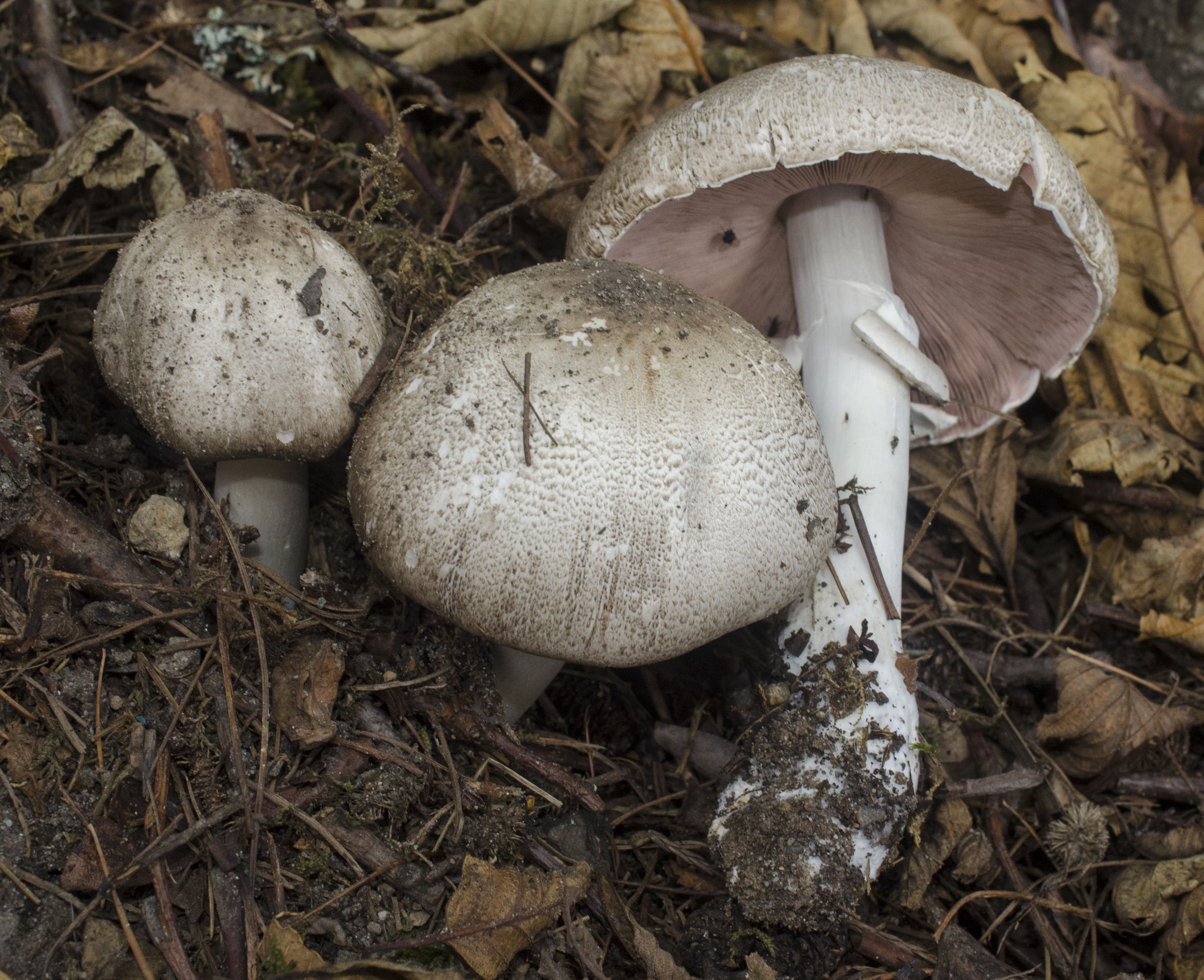

Scientific classification
- Kingdom: Fungi
- Division: Basidiomycota
- Class: Agaricomycetes
- Order: Agaricales
- Family: Agaricaceae
- Genus: Agaricus
- Species: A. deardorffensis

Binomial name
- Agaricus deardorffensis Kerrigan

= Agaricus deardorffensis =

Species of fungus

Agaricus deardorffensis is a common species of gilled mushroom found in the Pacific Northwest region of North America.

In the past this species (along with A. buckmacadooi, A. berryessae, and A. placomyces) was often misidentified as the European species Agaricus moelleri or the now defunct A. praeclaresquamosus, but genetic testing performed by Rick Kerrigan in 2016 has clarified them as numerous distinct species. This mushroom is considered poisonous and is likely to cause gastrointestinal symptoms if ingested.

Agaricus buckmacadooi
- Mycological characteristics
- Gills on hymenium
- Cap is convex or flat
- Hymenium is free
- Stipe has a ring
- Spore print is brown
- Edibility is poisonous
