= R. laeta =

R. laeta may refer to:

- Rhabdomastix laeta, a crane fly
- Russula laeta, a brittle gill
