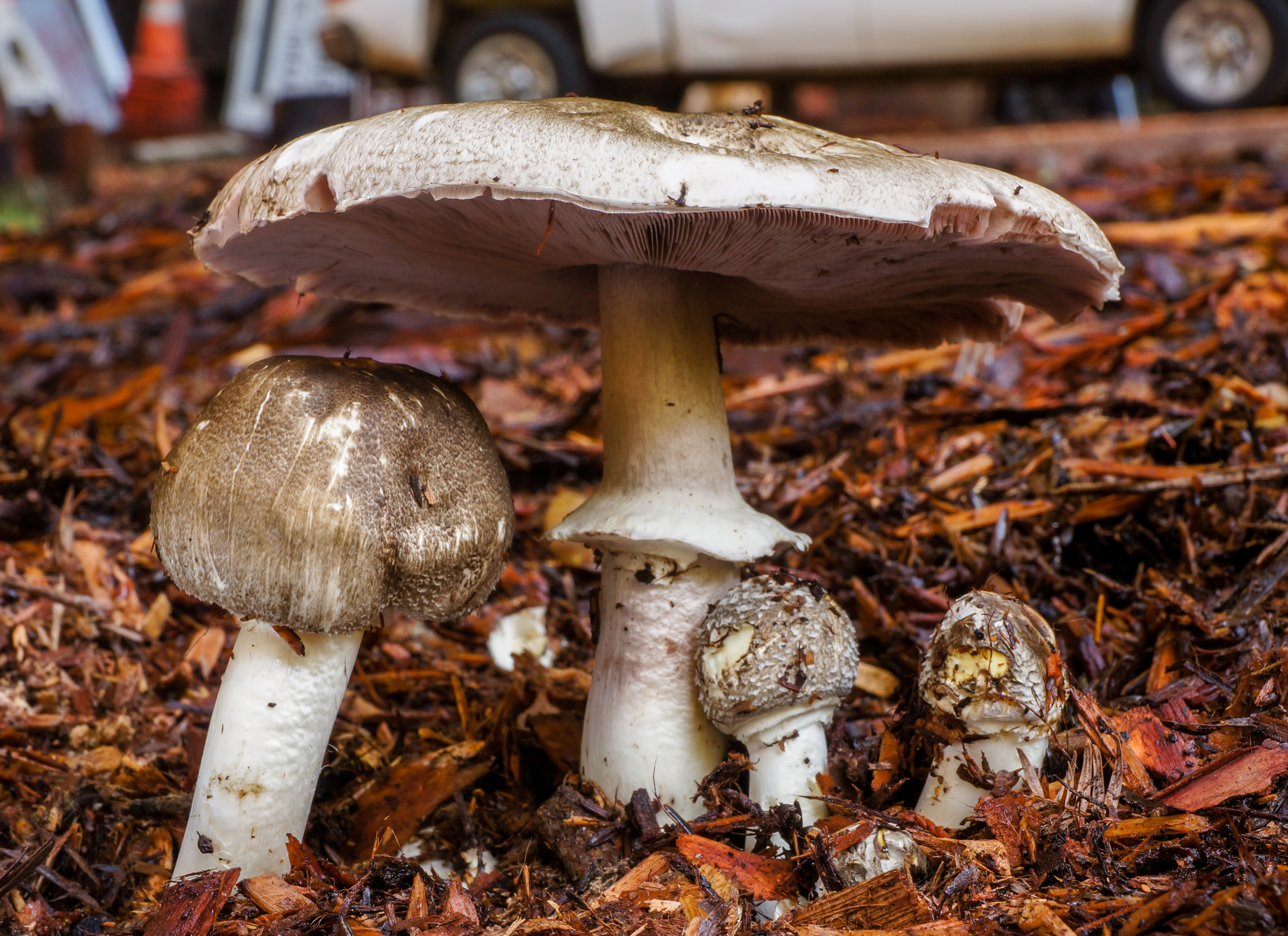

Scientific classification
- Kingdom: Fungi
- Division: Basidiomycota
- Class: Agaricomycetes
- Order: Agaricales
- Family: Agaricaceae
- Genus: Agaricus
- Species: A. buckmacadooi

Binomial name
- Agaricus buckmacadooi Kerrigan

= Agaricus buckmacadooi =

Agaricus buckmacadooi, commonly known as Buck's agaricus, is a species of mushroom in the family Agaricaceae. It is found on the Pacific coast of North America.

== Taxonomy ==
Agaricus buckmacadooi was first described by Rick Kerrigan in 2016. Prior to that, it was often grouped together with A. deardorffensis and A. berryessae as A. praeclareesquamosus or A. moelleri. At other times, these species were lumped in with A. placomyces. However, Kerrigan's research revealed that A. buckmacadooi, as well as A. deardorffensis and A. berryessae are in fact distinct species. A. moelleri is a European species, and A. placomyces is an Eastern North American species.

== Description ==
Agaricus buckmacadooi
- Mycological characteristics
- Gills on hymenium
- Cap is convex or flat
- Hymenium is free
- Stipe has a ring
- Spore print is brown
- Edibility is poisonous

The cap of Agaricus buckmacadooi is about 8-20 centimeters in diameter and is scaly and tannish brown. The cap starts out round or convex, before expanding out to broadly convex or flat. The stipe is 7-15 centimeters long and 1-4 centimeters wide, with a ring. The gills are free and start out a pale pink color, before becoming pinkish tan and finally brown with age. The flesh of this mushroom stains yellow.

=== Similar species ===
Agaricus buckmacadooi is similar to A. deardorffensis and A. berryessae. All three species smell phenolic, stain yellow, and are very difficult to tell apart.

== Habitat and ecology ==
Agaricus buckmackadooi is found under douglas fir, hemlock, and coastal redwood trees in forests. As a saprophytic fungus, it breaks down decaying material.
