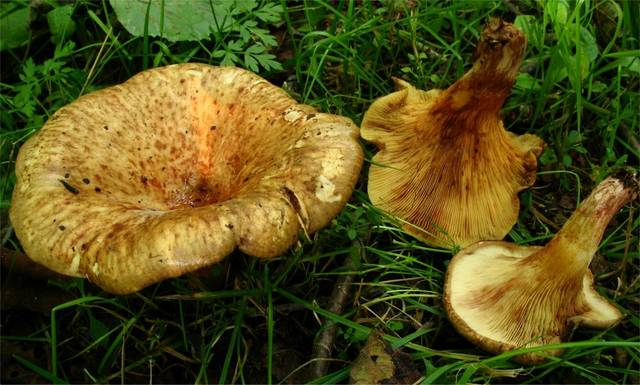

Scientific classification
- Kingdom: Fungi
- Division: Basidiomycota
- Class: Agaricomycetes
- Order: Boletales
- Family: Paxillaceae
- Genus: Paxillus
- Species: P. filamentosus

Binomial name
- Paxillus filamentosus (Scop.) Fr. (1838)

Synonyms
- Agaricus filamentosus Scop. (1772); Paxillus rubicundulus P.D.Orton (1969)

= Paxillus filamentosus =

Species of fungus

Paxillus filamentosus
- Mycological characteristics
- Gills on hymenium
- Cap is depressed
- Hymenium is decurrent
- Stipe is bare
- Spore print is brown
- Ecology is mycorrhizal
- Edibility is unknown

Paxillus filamentosus, commonly known as the alder roll-rim, is a basidiomycete fungus which is associated with alder (Alnus) in northern Europe and southwestern Greenland, and North America. It closely resembles Paxillus involutus, but its fruit bodies are generally smaller.

Some sources regard Paxillus rubicundulus as a synonym, but MycoBank and Index Fungorum treat it as different species.
