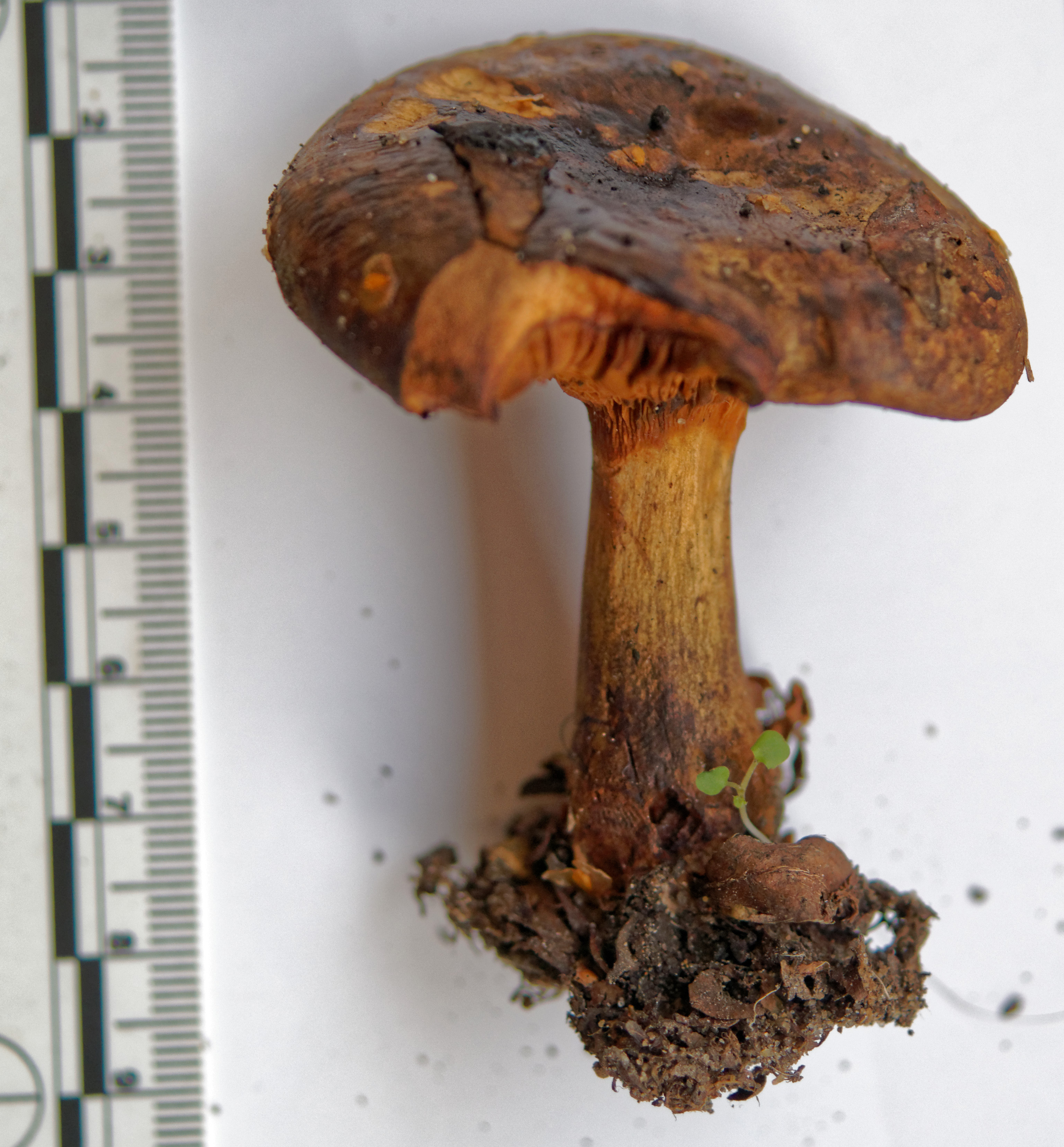

Scientific classification
- Kingdom: Fungi
- Division: Basidiomycota
- Class: Agaricomycetes
- Order: Boletales
- Family: Paxillaceae
- Genus: Paxillus
- Species: P. cuprinus

Binomial name
- Paxillus cuprinus P. Jargeat, H. Gryta, J.P. Chaumeton & Vizzini

= Paxillus cuprinus =

Paxillus cuprinus, commonly known as the coppery pax, is a species of mushroom in the family Paxillaceae. It is found in the Pacific Northwest.

== Description ==
The cap of Paxillus cuprinus is coppery in color. It starts out convex, before becoming flat. It is between 3 and 10 centimeters in diameter. The center of the cap has a dip, and the margin is inrolled. The stipe is about 3-7 centimeters long and 1.5-2.5 centimeters wide. The gills can be adnate or decurrent, and the spore print is brownish. Paxillus involutus is similar. However, it is rare in the Pacific Northwest, and smaller in size.

== Habitat and ecology ==
Paxillus cuprinus is found under birch trees in both forests and cities.

== Toxicity ==
Paxillus cuprinus is poisonous, and contains a toxin that causes the immune system to target red blood cells.

Paxillus cuprinus
- Mycological characteristics
- Gills on hymenium
- Cap is convex or flat
- Hymenium is adnate or decurrent
- Stipe is bare
- Spore print is ochre to reddish-brown
- Ecology is mycorrhizal
- Edibility is poisonous
