= Chemical tests in mushroom identification =

Chemical tests used to identify mushrooms

Chemical tests in mushroom identification are methods that aid in determining the variety of some fungi. The most useful tests are Melzer's reagent and potassium hydroxide.

== Ammonia ==
Household ammonia can be used. A couple of drops are placed on the flesh. For example, Boletus spadiceus gives a fleeting blue to blue-green reaction.

== Iron salts ==
Iron salts are used commonly in Russula and Bolete identification. It is best to dissolve the salts in water (typically a 10% solution) and then apply to the flesh, but it is sometimes possible to apply the dry salts directly to see a color change. For example, the white flesh of Boletus chrysenteron stains lemon-yellow or olive. Three results are expected with the iron salts tests: no change indicates a negative reaction; a color change to olive, green or blackish green; or a color change to reddish-pink.

== Meixner test for amatoxins ==
The Meixner test (also known as the Wieland test) uses concentrated hydrochloric acid and newspaper to test for the deadly amatoxins found in some species of Amanita, Lepiota, and Galerina. The test yields false positives for some compounds, such as psilocin.

== Melzer's reagent ==
Melzer's reagent can be used to test whether spores are amyloid, nonamyloid, or dextrinoid.

- Spores that stain bluish-gray to bluish-black are amyloid
- Spores that stain brown to reddish-brown are dextrinoid

This test is normally performed on white spored mushrooms. If the spores are not light colored, a change will not be readily apparent. It is easiest to see the color change under a microscope, but it is possible to see it with the naked eye with a good spore print.

== Paradimethylaminobenzaldehyde ==
In the genus Lyophyllum the lamellae usually turn blue with the application of para-Dimethylaminobenzaldehyde (PDAB or pDAB).

== Phenol ==
A 2–3% aqueous solution of phenol gives a color change in some species when applied to the cap or stem.

== Potassium hydroxide ==
A 3–10% solution of potassium hydroxide (KOH) gives a color change in some species of mushrooms:

- In Agaricus, some species such as A. xanthodermus turn yellow with KOH, many have no reaction, and A. subrutilescens turns green.
- Distinctive change occurs for some species of Cortinarius and Boletes

== Schaeffer reaction ==
Developed by Julius Schäffer to help with the identification of Agaricus species. A positive reaction of Schaeffer's test, which uses the reaction of aniline and nitric acid on the surface of the mushroom, is indicated by an orange to red color; it is characteristic of species in the section Flavescentes. The compounds responsible for the reaction were named schaefferal A and B to honor Schäffer.

Two intersecting lines are drawn on the surface of the cap, the first with aniline or aniline water, the second with an aqueous solution of 65% nitric acid. The test is considered positive when a bright orange color forms where the lines cross.

Agaricus placomyces and Agaricus xanthodermus produce false negative reactions.

Sometimes referred to as "Schaeffer's reaction", "Schaeffer's cross reaction" or "Schaeffer's test".

== Aniline + acid(s) ==
Kerrigan's 2016 Agaricus of North America P45: (Referring to Schaffer's reaction) "In fact I recommend switching to the following modified test. Frank (1988) developed an alternative formulation in which aniline oil is combined with glacial acetic acid (GAA, essentially distilled vinegar) in a 50:50 solution. GAA is a much safer, less reactive acid. This single combined reagent is relatively stable over time. A single spot or line applied to the pileus (or other surface). In my experience the newer formulation works as well as Schaffer's while being safer and more convenient."

== Sulfo-vanillin ==
Made from sulfuric acid (H_{2}SO_{4}) and vanillin (vanilla). Used in Russula and Panaeolus identification.
