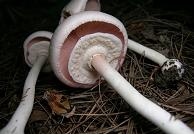

Scientific classification
- Domain: Eukaryota
- Kingdom: Fungi
- Division: Basidiomycota
- Class: Agaricomycetes
- Order: Agaricales
- Family: Agaricaceae
- Genus: Agaricus
- Species: A. pocillator

Binomial name
- Agaricus pocillator Murrill, 1941

= Agaricus pocillator =

Species of fungus

Agaricus pocillator Mycological characteristics
- Gills on hymenium
- Cap is convex or flat
- Hymenium is free
- Stipe has a ring
- Spore print is brown
- Ecology is saprotrophic
- Edibility is inedible

Agaricus pocillator, a woodland mushroom, is distributed through southeastern North America in ranges at least as far north as Illinois. It can be distinguished in the field by its dark center, its small, bulbous base, which stains yellow, and its relatively slight stature. It is very similar to Agaricus placomyces, but is a slightly smaller mushroom with a scalier cap and a more northern range within the United States. A. pocillator is inedible, and several other yellow-staining Agaricus species are poisonous. Hikers are often warned to avoid eating it when spotted.

== Ecology ==
They are saprobic, meaning that they survive by decomposing dead or decaying organic material. They often grow alone or gregariously under hardwoods and in mixed woods throughout the southeast of North America.

== Description ==
Their cap is 3–10 cm, convex to broadly convex or nearly flat in age, sometimes with an obscure, darker bump, and dry. The top is mainly whitish to dingy, developing vaguely concentric brownish to grayish scales towards the center. Their gills are free from the stem, close, and white, becoming pinkish, then brown.

The stem is 4–8 cm long, 0.5–1 cm thick, more or less equal, and contains a small bulbous base that bruises yellow. In addition, it has a ring that typically persists into maturity, and a partial veil when covering the gills not developing dark droplets.

The flesh is white throughout and staining bright yellow in the base.

The taste is not distinctive or somewhat unpleasant. In contrast, the odor is often unpleasant (phenolic), but sometimes not distinctive.

The spore print is brown.

Chemical reactions involve combining the cap and flesh yellow with potassium hydroxide (KOH).

The spores are 4.5–6 x 3–3.8 μm and elliptical.

== See also ==
- List of Agaricus species
