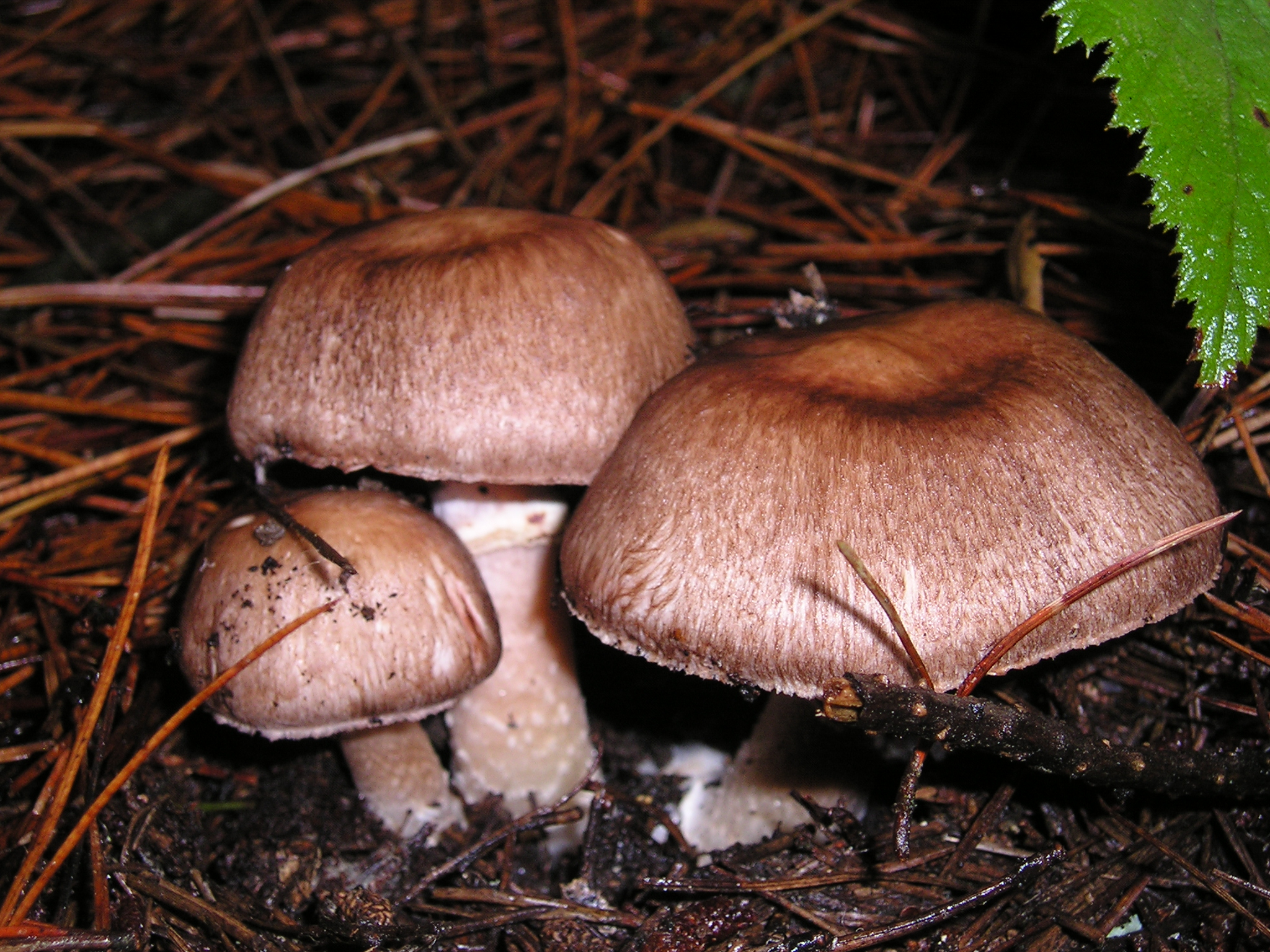

Scientific classification
- Domain: Eukaryota
- Kingdom: Fungi
- Division: Basidiomycota
- Class: Agaricomycetes
- Order: Agaricales
- Family: Agaricaceae
- Genus: Agaricus
- Species: A. subrutilescens

Binomial name
- Agaricus subrutilescens (Kauffman) Hotson & D.E.Stuntz (1938)

Synonyms
- Psalliota subrutilescens Kauffman (1925)

= Agaricus subrutilescens =

Species of fungus

Agaricus subrutilescens Mycological characteristics
- Gills on hymenium
- Cap is convex
- Hymenium is free
- Stipe has a ring
- Spore print is brown
- Ecology is saprotrophic
- Edibility is edible but not recommended

Agaricus subrutilescens, also known as the wine-colored agaricus, is a mushroom of the genus Agaricus.

== Taxonomy ==
The species was first described scientifically in 1925 as Psalliota subrutilescens. It was transferred to Agaricus in 1938.

== Description ==
Agaricus subrutilescens has a cap that is 5–15 cm (2–6 in) across, dry, and has many wine to brown colored fibrils, especially near the center. The gills are close and white at first, turning pinkish and then dark brown in age. The stalk has a skirt-like ring and is 4 to 20 cm (1 5/8 to 7 7/8 in) long, 1–3 cm (3/8–1 1/8 in) thick, white, and covered with soft woolly scales below the ring. The flesh is white and does not stain, and the odor and taste are mild.

The purplish fibrous cap and shaggy white stem differentiate this mushroom from others which resemble it. Similar species include Agaricus hondensis and A. moelleri.

== Habitat and distribution ==
The mushroom fruits in undisturbed mixed woods in Western North America and Japan. It grows by itself or scattered in small clusters, often under redwood, pine, or alder. Recently this mushroom has been identified in New Zealand and Australia.

== Edibility ==
This mushroom is variously described as edible, inedible, or responsible for causing gastric upset.

== See also ==
- List of Agaricus species
