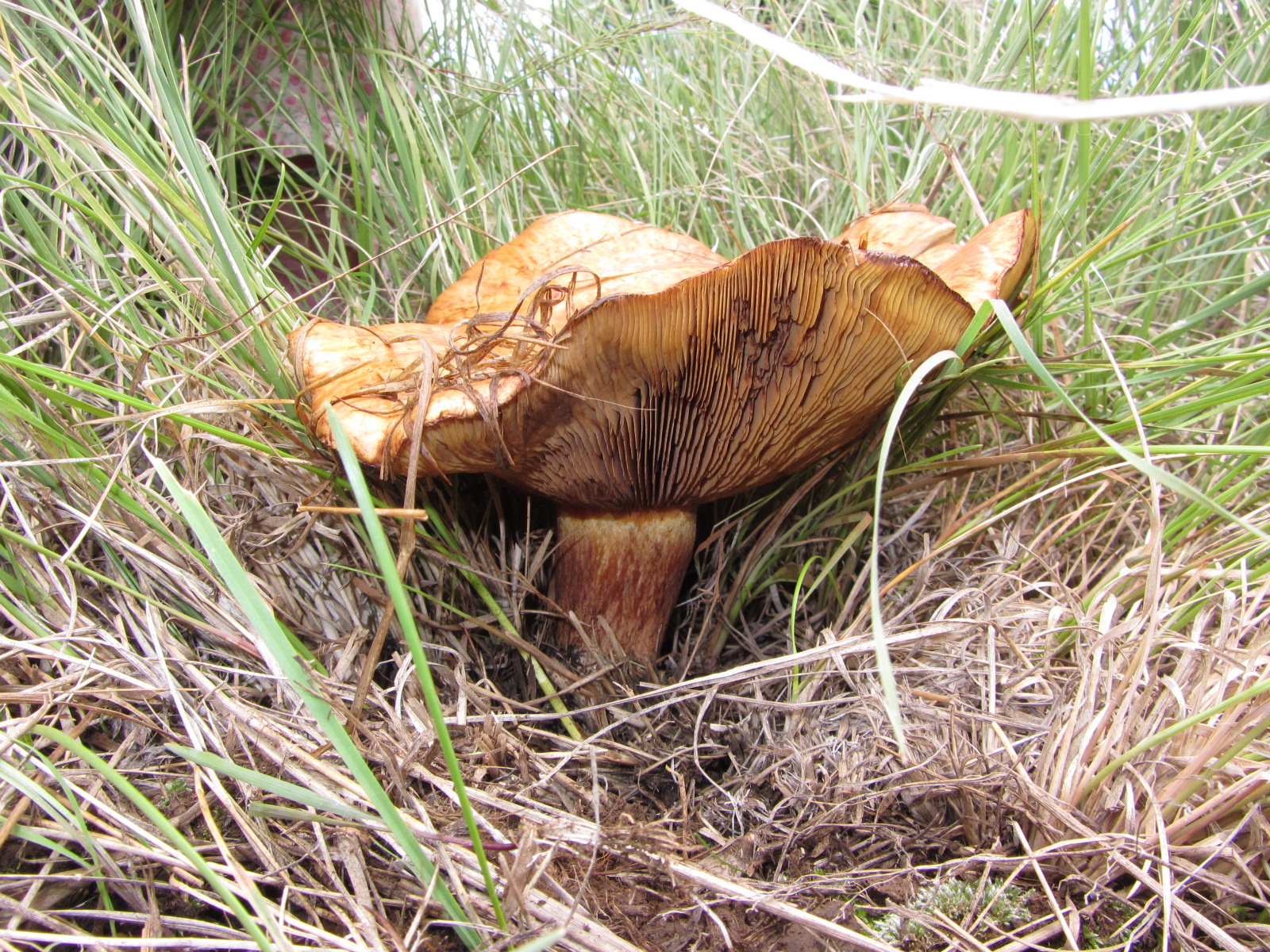

Scientific classification
- Domain: Eukaryota
- Kingdom: Fungi
- Division: Basidiomycota
- Class: Agaricomycetes
- Order: Boletales
- Family: Paxillaceae
- Genus: Paxillus
- Species: P. vernalis

Binomial name
- Paxillus vernalis Watling (1969)

= Paxillus vernalis =

Species of fungus

Paxillus vernalis Mycological characteristics
- Gills on hymenium
- Cap is depressed
- Hymenium is decurrent
- Stipe is bare
- Spore print is brown
- Ecology is mycorrhizal
- Edibility is poisonous

Paxillus vernalis is a basidiomycete fungus found in montane forests in northern North America. It closely resembles the poisonous Paxillus involutus, and is considered likely to also be poisonous. The fungus was described as new to science by Scottish mycologist Roy Watling in 1969.
