= Micropsalliota albofelina =

Scientific classification
- Kingdom: Fungi
- Division: Basidiomycota
- Class: Agaricomycetes
- Order: Agaricales
- Family: Agaricaceae
- Genus: Micropsalliota
- Species: M. albofelina

Binomial name
- Micropsalliota albofelina Ivanova D.D. & Morozova O.V. (2021)

Species of fungus

Micropsalliota albofelina
- Mycological characteristics
- Gills on hymenium
- Cap is convex
- Hymenium is free
- Stipe is bare
- Spore print is brown
- Ecology is saprotrophic
- Edibility is not recommended

Micropsalliota albofelina is a basidiomycete mushroom native to tropical evergreen forests in Vietnam. It was collected in Bù Gia Mập National Park in 2011 and described in 2021. This mushroom has white, tiny basidiomes, the entire surface of which is covered by thin hairs. This species is the first generic report for Vietnam.

== Etymology ==
The specific epithet albofelina comes from Latin (albus, "white" + felis "cat") referring to the surface of basidiomes that resembles white feline fur.

== Description ==
The whole basidiome of M. albofelina is pure white when fresh, discolouring to brown when dry. The pileus is up to 5 mm in diameter, convex, the surface of it is covered by white hairs. The gills are free, with 1–2 series of lamellulae. The stipe is up to 29 mm tall by 1.5 mm wide, cylindrical, without a ring. The spores are 5.5–7.5 by 3.5–4 μm, ellipsoid in form, with apical thickening. The basidia are 12.5–17.5 by 6.5–8 μm, clavate with 4 sterigmata. The cheilocystidia are 33–34.5 by 10–13 μm, irregularly lecythiform, capitate, with a long, narrow and fragile neck.
