= Julius Schäffer =

German mycologist (1882–1944)

Julius Schäffer (3 June 1882 – 21 October 1944) was a German mycologist. His contributions include studies on the Agaricales (gilled mushrooms), especially the genus Russula, about which he wrote a monograph in 1933 and issued the exsiccata Russulae exsiccatae a Jul. Schaeffer in Annal. Mycolog. vol. 31 & 32 (Russula-Monographie) descriptae. Later, he revised the genus in the series Die Pilze Mitteleuropas (1926–1967); his notes were published posthumously by his wife Liesel in 1952 with the help of other mycologists. The work was considered the "authoritative treatment of the group for Central Europe". One of the Russula species that was first described in this publication was R. laeta. Schäffer developed a chemical test to help with the identification of Agaricus species. A positive reaction of Schaeffer's test, which uses the reaction of aniline and nitric acid on the surface of the mushroom, is indicated by an orange-to-red color; it is characteristic of species in the section Flavescentes. The compounds responsible for the reaction were named schaefferal A and B to honor Schäffer.

Schäffer is the only mycologist of modern times known to have died from consuming poisonous mushrooms, in this case, Paxillus involutus. About an hour after he and his wife had eaten a meal prepared with the mushrooms, Schäffer developed vomiting, diarrhea, and fever. His condition worsened to the point where he was admitted to hospital the following day, and subsequently developed renal failure, perishing after 17 days.

== Eponymous taxa ==
Several species have been named in honor of Schaeffer:

- Agaricus schaefferianus Hlaváček 1987
  - now Agaricus crocodilinus Agaricus crocodilinus Murrill
- Cortinarius schaefferanus (M.M. Moser) M.M. Moser 1967
- Russula nauseosa var. schaefferi Kill. 1939
- Russula schaefferi Kärcher 1996
- Russula schaefferiana Niolle 1943
- Russula schaefferina Rawla & Sarwal 1983

== Selected publications ==
- Schäffer, J. (1947). "Beobachtungen an Oberbayerischen Blätterpilzen". Berichte der bayerischen botanischen Gesellschaft 27: 201–225.
