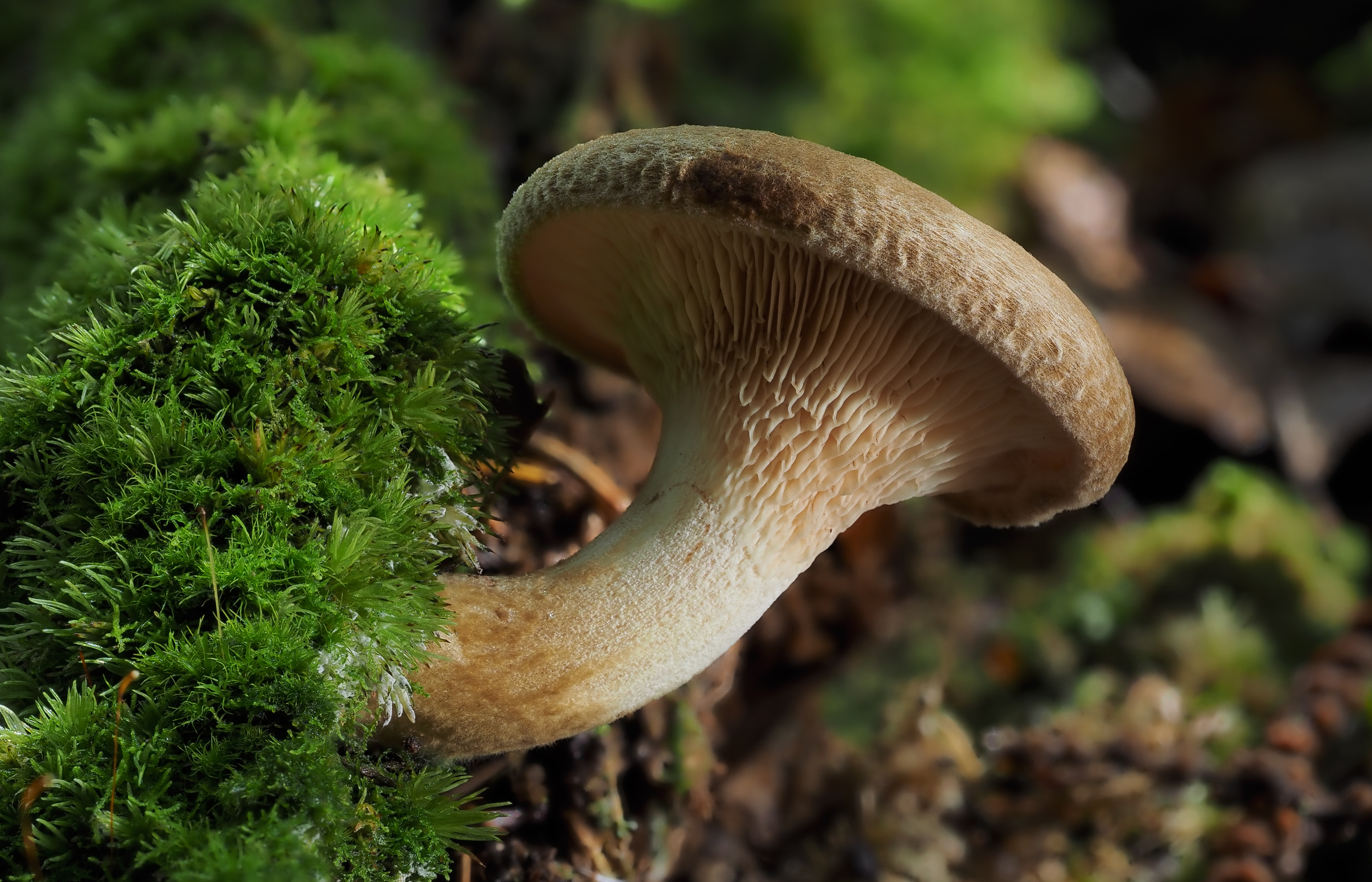

Scientific classification
- Kingdom: Fungi
- Division: Basidiomycota
- Class: Agaricomycetes
- Order: Boletales
- Family: Paxillaceae
- Genus: Paxillus
- Species: P. involutus

Binomial name
- Paxillus involutus (Batsch) Fr. (1838)

Synonyms
- Agaricus contiguus Bull. (1785); Agaricus involutus Batsch (1786); Agaricus adscendibus Bolton (1788); Omphalia involuta (Batsch) Gray (1821); Rhymovis involuta (Batsch) Rabenh. (1844)

= Paxillus involutus =

Species of fungus

Paxillus involutus
- Mycological characteristics
- Gills on hymenium
- Cap is depressed
- Hymenium is decurrent
- Stipe is bare
- Spore print is brown
- Ecology is mycorrhizal
- Edibility is deadly

Paxillus involutus, also known as the brown roll-rim or the common roll-rim, is a species of basidiomycete fungus. Although it has gills, it is more closely related to the pored boletes than to typical gilled mushrooms. It was first described by Pierre Bulliard in 1785, and was given its current binomial name by Elias Magnus Fries in 1838. Genetic testing suggests that Paxillus involutus may be a species complex rather than a single species. Various shades of brown in colour, the fruit body grows up to 6 cm (2 3/8 in) high and has a funnel-shaped cap up to 12 cm (4 3/4 in) wide with a distinctive inrolled rim and decurrent gills that may be pore-like close to the stipe.

The species is widely distributed across the Northern Hemisphere. It has been inadvertently introduced to Australia, New Zealand, South Africa, and South America, probably transported in soil with European trees. It is common in deciduous and coniferous woods and grass in late summer and autumn, forming ectomycorrhizal relationships with a broad range of tree species. These benefit from the symbiosis as the fungus reduces their intake of heavy metals and increases resistance to pathogens such as Fusarium oxysporum.

Previously considered edible and eaten in parts of Europe, it has been found to be deadly poisonous, after being responsible for the death of German mycologist Julius Schäffer in 1944. It had been recognized as causing gastric upsets when eaten raw, but was more recently found to cause potentially fatal autoimmune hemolysis, even in those who had consumed the mushroom for years without any other ill effects. An unknown antigen in the mushroom triggers the immune system to attack red blood cells. Serious and commonly fatal complications include acute kidney injury, shock, acute respiratory failure, and disseminated intravascular coagulation.

== Taxonomy ==
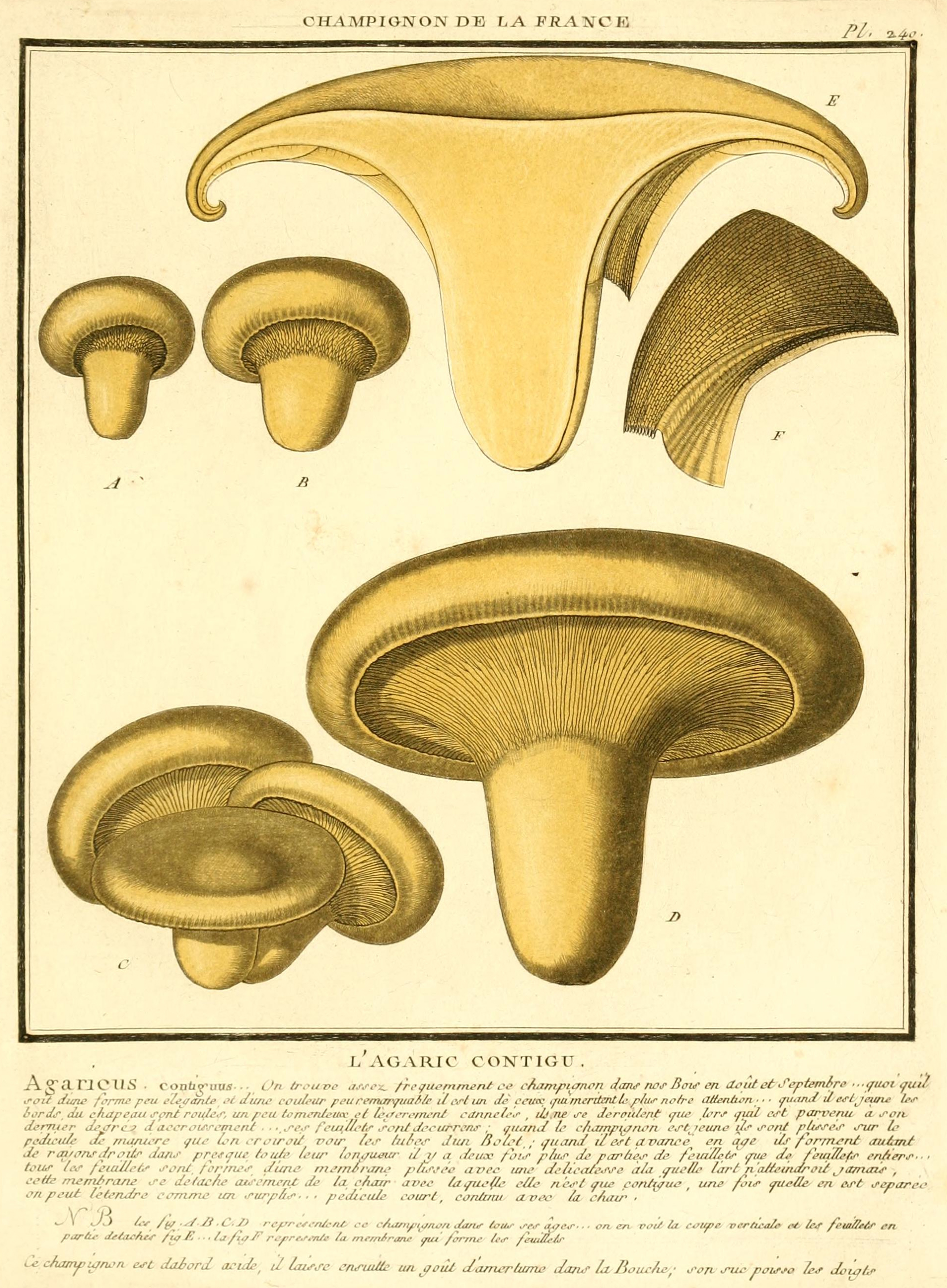
Bulliard's 1785 drawing of "L'Agaric contigu" (Agaricus contiguus)

The species was described by French mycologist Pierre Bulliard in 1785 as Agaricus contiguus, although the 1786 combination Agaricus involutus of August Batsch is taken as the first valid description. James Bolton published a description of what he called Agaricus adscendibus in 1788; the taxonomical authority Index Fungorum considers this to be synonymous with P. involutus. Additional synonyms include Omphalia involuta described by Samuel Frederick Gray in 1821, and Rhymovis involuta, published by Gottlob Ludwig Rabenhorst in 1844. The species gained its current binomial name in 1838 when the 'father of mycology', Swedish naturalist Elias Magnus Fries erected the genus Paxillus, and set it as the type species. The starting date of fungal taxonomy had been set as January 1, 1821, to coincide with the date of Fries' works, which meant that names coined earlier than this date required sanction by Fries (indicated in the name by a colon) to be considered valid. It was thus written Paxillus involutus (Batsch:Fr.) Fr. A 1987 revision of the International Code of Botanical Nomenclature set the starting date at May 1, 1753, the date of publication of Linnaeus' seminal work, the Species Plantarum. Hence the name no longer requires the ratification of Fries' authority.

The genus was later placed in a new family, Paxillaceae, by French mycologist René Maire who held it to be related to both agarics and boletes. Although it has gills rather than pores, it has long been recognised as belonging to the pored mushrooms of the order Boletales rather than the traditional agarics. The generic name is derived from the Latin for 'peg' or 'plug', and the specific epithet involutus, 'inrolled', refers to the cap margin. Common names include the naked brimcap, poison paxillus, inrolled pax, poison pax, common roll-rim, brown roll-rim, and brown chanterelle. Gray called it the "involved navel-stool" in his 1821 compendium of British flora.

Studies of the ecology and genetics of Paxillus involutus indicate that it may form a complex of multiple similar-looking species. In a field study near Uppsala, Sweden, conducted from 1981 to 1983, mycologist Nils Fries found that there were three populations of P. involutus unable to breed with each other. One was found under conifers and mixed woodlands, while the other two were found in parklands, associated with nearby birch trees. He found that the first group tended to produce single isolated fruit bodies which had a thinner stipe and cap which was less inrolled at the margins, while the fruit bodies of the other two populations tended to appear in groups, and have thicker stipes, and caps with more inrolled and sometimes undulating margins. There were only general tendencies and he was unable to detect any consistent macroscopic or microscopic features that firmly differentiate them. A molecular study comparing the DNA sequences of specimens of Paxillus involutus collected from various habitats in Bavaria found that those collected from parks and gardens showed a close relationship with the North American species P. vernalis, while those from forests were allied with P. filamentosus. The authors suggested the park populations may have been introduced from North America. A multi-gene analysis of European isolates showed that P. involutus sensu lato (in the loose sense) could be separated into four distinct, genetically isolated lineages corresponding to P. obscurosporus, P. involutus sensu stricto (in the strict sense), P. validus, and a fourth species that has not yet been identified. Changes in host range have occurred frequently and independently among strains within this species complex.

== Description ==
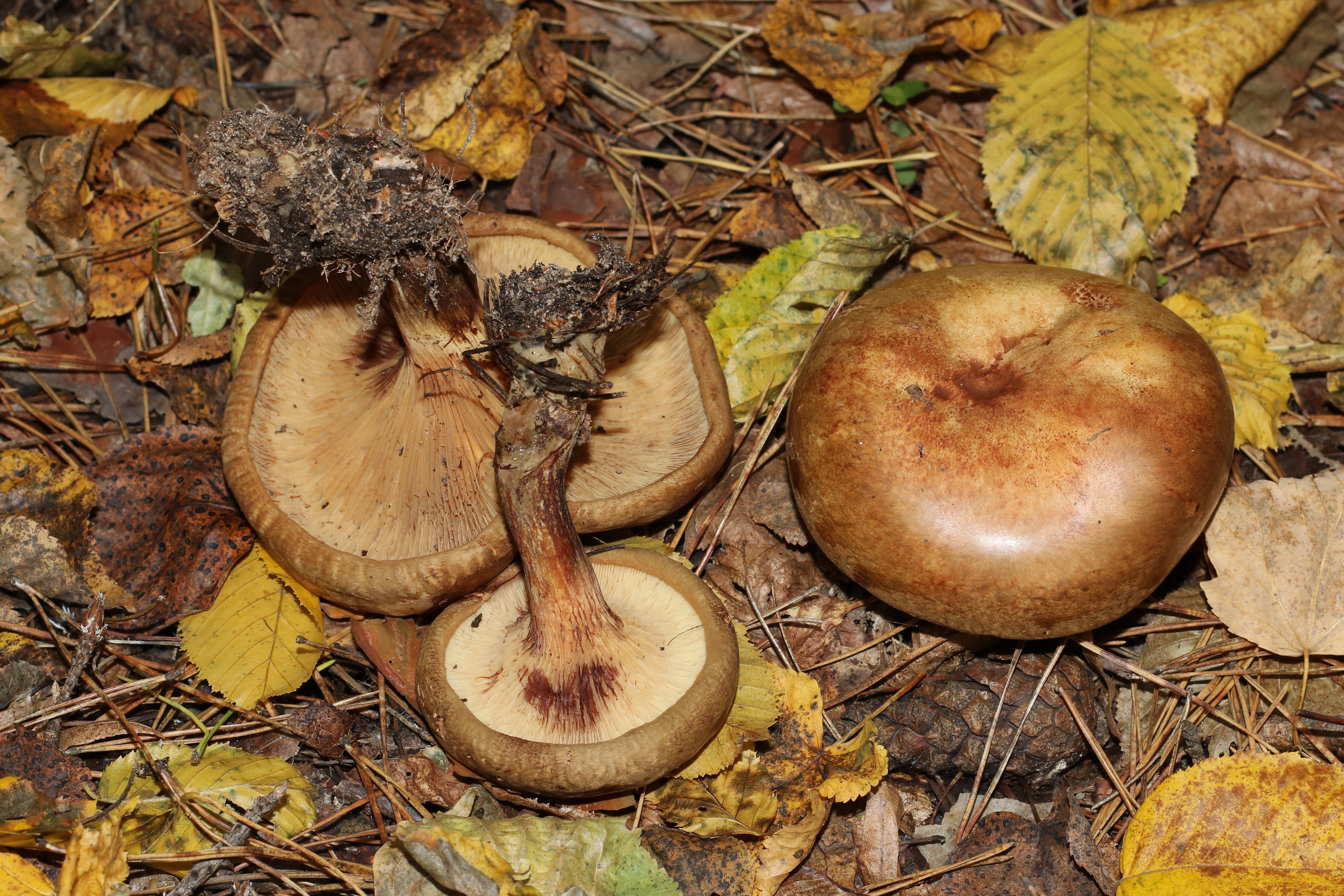
The gills are attached decurrently – extending down the length of the stipe.

Resembling a brown wooden top, the epigeous (aboveground) fruit body may be up to 6 cm (2 1/4 in) tall. The cap, initially convex then more funnel-shaped (infundibuliform) with a depressed centre and rolled rim (hence the common name), may be reddish-, yellowish- or olive-brown in colour and typically 4–12 cm (1 5/8–4 3/4 in) wide; the cap diameter does not get larger than 15 cm (6 in). The cap surface is initially downy and later smooth, becoming sticky when wet. The cap and cap margin initially serve to protect the gills of young fruit bodies: this is termed pilangiocarpic development. The narrow brownish yellow gills are decurrent and forked, and can be peeled easily from the flesh (as is the case with the pores of boletes). Gills further down toward the stipe become more irregular and anastomose, and can even resemble the pores of bolete-type fungi. The fungus darkens when bruised and older specimens may have darkish patches. The juicy yellowish flesh has a mild to faintly sour or sharp odor and taste, and has been described as well-flavored upon cooking. Of similar colour to the cap, the short stipe measures some 3–6 cm tall and 1–3 wide, can be crooked, and tapers toward the base.

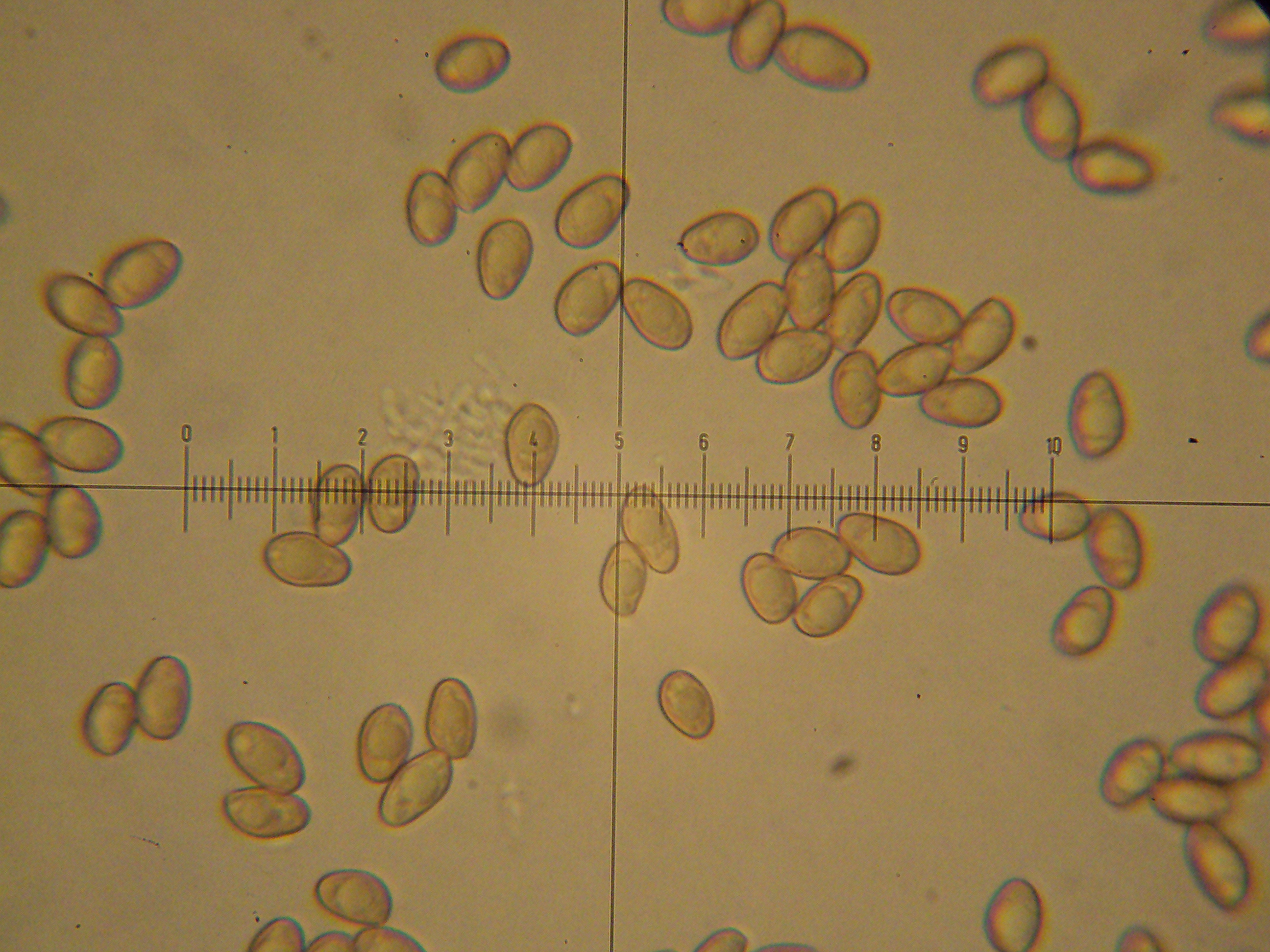
The spores are ellipsoidal.

The spore print is brown, and the dimensions of the ellipsoid (oval-shaped) spores are 7.5–9 by 5–6 μm. The hymenium has cystidia both on the gill edge and face (cheilo- and pleurocystidia respectively), which are slender and filament-like, typically measuring 40–65 by 8–10.5 μm.

=== Similar species ===
The brownish colour and funnel-like shape of P. involutus can lead to its confusion with several species of Lactarius, many of which have some degree of toxicity themselves. The lack of a milky exudate distinguishes it from any milk cap. One of the more similar is L. turpis, which presents a darker olive colouration. The related North American Paxillus vernalis has a darker spore print, thicker stipe and is found under aspen, whereas the closer relative P. filamentosus is more similar in appearance to P. involutus. A rare species that grows only in association with alder, P. filamentosus can be distinguished from it by the pressed-down scales on the cap surface that point towards the cap margin, a light yellow flesh that bruises only slightly brown, and deep yellow-ochre gills that do not change colour upon injury

The most similar species are two once thought to be part of P. involutus in Europe. Paxillus obscurisporus (originally obscurosporus) has larger fruit bodies than P. involutus, with caps up to 40 cm (16 in) wide whose margins tend to unroll and flatten with age, and a layer of cream-coloured mycelia covering the base of its tapered stipe. P. validus, also known only from Europe, has caps up to 20 cm (7 7/8 in) wide with a stipe that is more or less equal in width throughout its length. Found under broadleaved trees in parks, it can be reliably distinguished from P. involutus (and other Paxillus species) by the presence of crystals up to 2.5 μm long in the rhizomorphs, as the crystals found in rhizomorphs of other Paxillus species do not exceed 0.5 μm long.

Other similar species include Phylloporus arenicola, Tapinella atrotomentosa, and Tapinella panuoides.

== Ecology, distribution and habitat ==
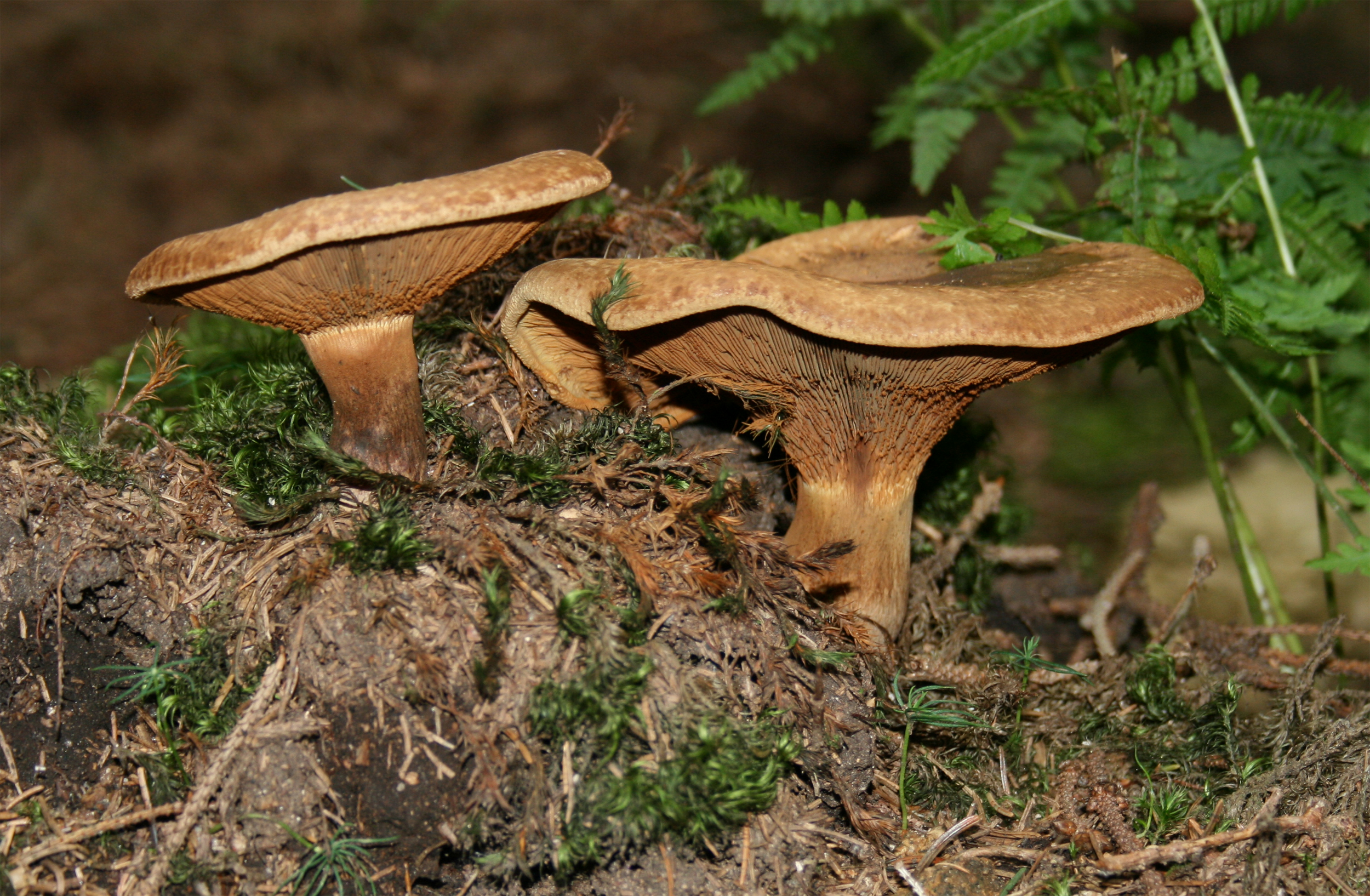
P. involutus found in South Bohemia, Czech Republic

Paxillus involutus forms ectomycorrhizal relationships with a number of coniferous and deciduous tree species. Because the fungus has somewhat unspecialized nutrient requirements and a relatively broad host specificity, it has been frequently used in research and seedling inoculation programs. There is evidence of the benefit to trees of this arrangement: in one experiment where P. involutus was cultivated on the root exudate of red pine (Pinus resinosa), the root showed markedly increased resistance to pathogenic strains of the ubiquitous soil fungus Fusarium oxysporum. Seedlings inoculated with P. involutus also showed increased resistance to Fusarium. Thus P. involutus may be producing antifungal compounds which protect the host plants from root rot. Paxillus involutus also decreases the uptake of certain toxic elements, acting as a buffer against heavy metal toxicity in the host plant. For example, the fungus decreased the toxicity of cadmium and zinc to Scots pine (Pinus sylvestris) seedlings: even though cadmium itself inhibits ectomycorrhiza formation in seedlings, colonization with P. involutus decreases cadmium and zinc transport to the plant shoots and alters the ratio of zinc transported to the roots and shoots, causing more cadmium to be retained in the roots of the seedlings rather than distributed through its entire metabolism. Evidence suggests that the mechanism for this detoxification involves the cadmium binding to the fungal cell walls, as well as accumulating in the vacuolar compartments. Further, ectomycorrhizal hyphae exposed to copper or cadmium drastically increase production of a metallothionein—a low molecular weight protein that binds metals.

The presence of Paxillus involutus is related to much reduced numbers of bacteria associated with the roots of Pinus sylvestris. Instead bacteria are found on the external mycelium. The types of bacteria change as well; a Finnish study published in 1997 found that bacterial communities under P. sylvestris without mycorrhizae metabolised organic and amino acids, while communities among P. involutus metabolised the sugar fructose. Paxillus involutus benefits from the presence of some species of bacteria in the soil it grows in. As the fungus grows it excretes polyphenols, waste products that are toxic to itself and impede its growth, but these compounds are metabolised by some bacteria, resulting in increased fungal growth. Bacteria also produce certain compounds such as citric and malic acid, which stimulate P. involutus.

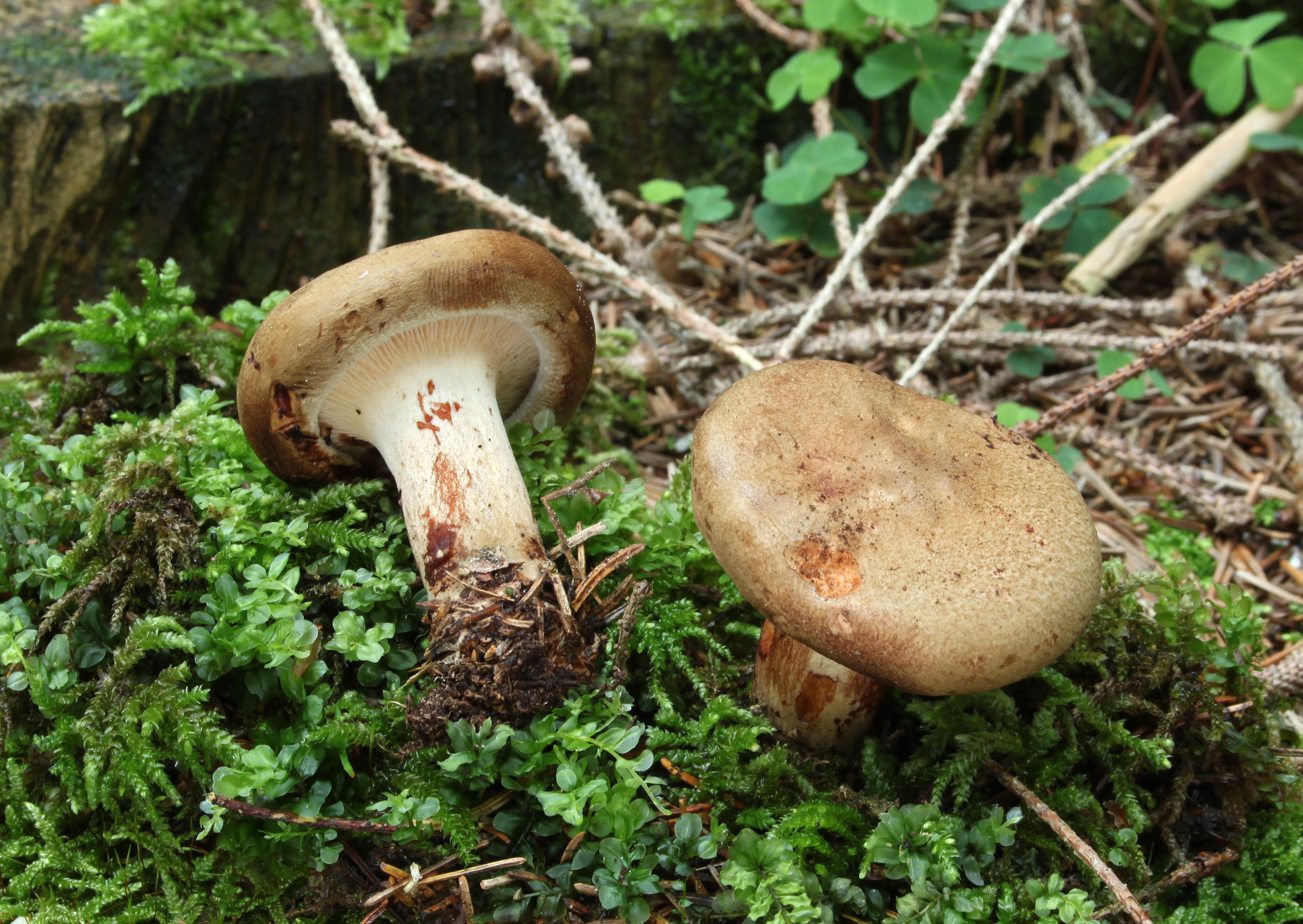
Found in Ulm, Germany

Highly abundant, the species is found across the Northern Hemisphere, Europe and Asia, with records from India, China, Japan, Iran, and Turkey's eastern Anatolia. It is equally widely distributed across northern North America, extending north to Alaska, where it has been collected from tundra near Coldfoot in the interior of the state. In southwestern Greenland, P. involutus has been recorded under the birch species Betula nana, B. pubescens and B. glandulosa. The mushroom is more common in coniferous woods in Europe, but is also closely associated with birch (Betula pendula). Within woodland, it prefers wet places or boggy ground, and avoids calcareous (chalky) soils. It has been noted to grow alongside Boletus badius in Europe, and Leccinum scabrum and Lactarius plumbeus in the Pacific Northwest region of North America. There it is found in both deciduous and coniferous woodland, commonly under plantings of white birch (Betula papyrifera) in urban areas. It is one of a small number of fungal species which thrive in Pinus radiata plantations planted outside their natural range. A study of polluted Scots pine forest around Oulu in northern Finland found that P. involutus became more abundant in more polluted areas while other species declined. Emissions from pulp mills, fertiliser, heating and traffic were responsible for the pollution, which was measured by sulfur levels in the pine needles.

Paxillus involutus can be found growing on lawns and old meadows throughout its distribution. Fruit bodies are generally terrestrial, though they may be found on woody material around tree stumps. They generally appear in autumn and late summer. In California, David Arora discerned a larger form associated with oak and pine which appears in late autumn and winter, as well as the typical form that is associated with birch plantings and appears in autumn. Several species of flies and beetles have been recorded using the fruit bodies to rear their young. The mushroom can be infected by Hypomyces chrysospermus, or bolete eater, a mould species that parasitises Boletales members. Infection results in the appearance of a whitish powder that first manifests on the pores, then spreads over the surface of the mushroom, becoming golden yellow to reddish-brown in maturity.

Australian mycologist John Burton Cleland noted it occurring under larch (Larix), oak, pine, birch and other introduced trees in South Australia in 1934, and it has subsequently been recorded in New South Wales, Victoria (where it was found near Betula and Populus) and Western Australia. It has been recorded under introduced birch (Betula) and hazel (Corylus) in New Zealand. Mycologist Rolf Singer reported a similar situation in South America, with the species recorded under introduced trees in Chile. It is likely to have been transported to those countries in the soil of imported European trees.

== Toxicity ==
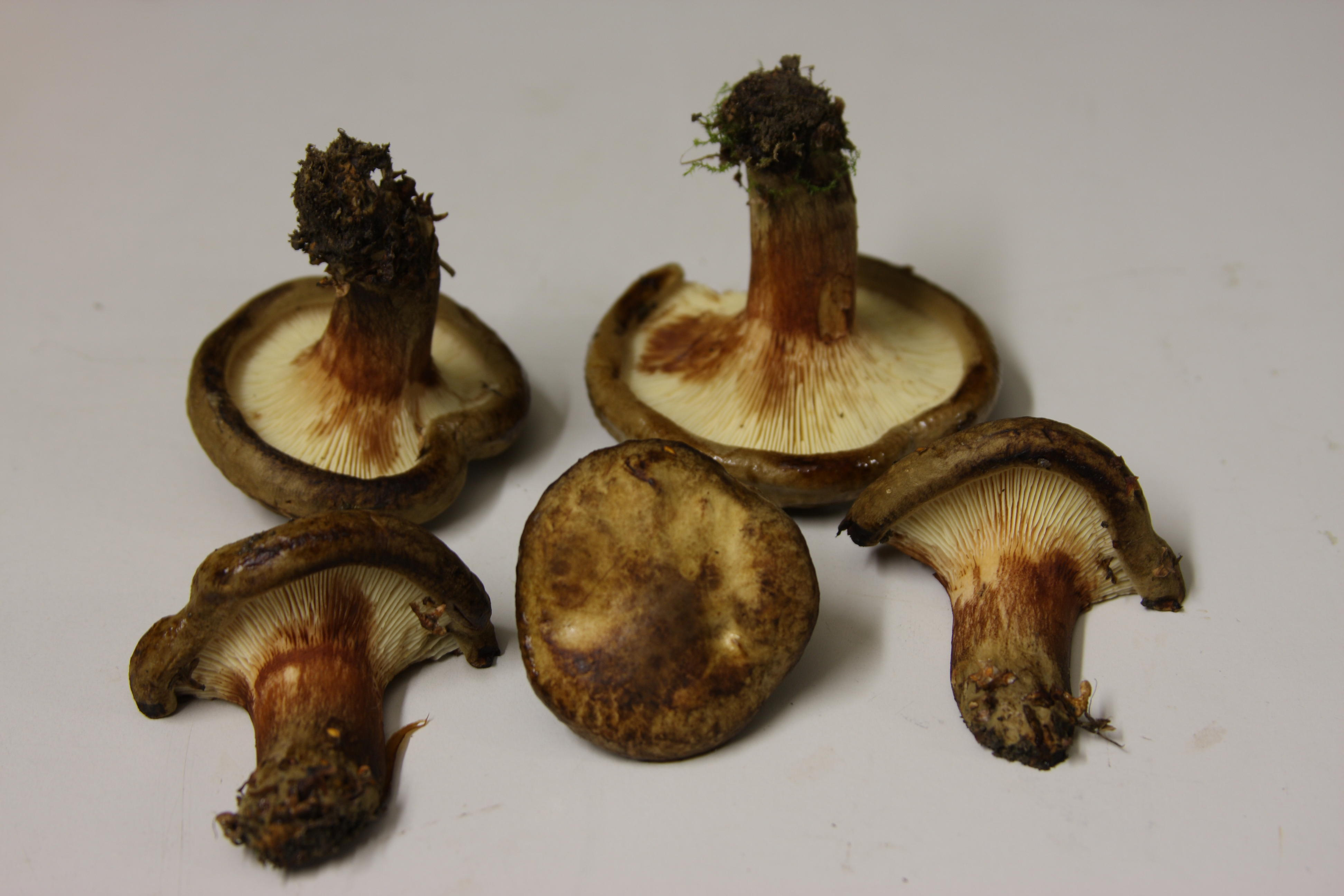
A collection from Folsom, California

Paxillus involutus was widely eaten in Central and Eastern Europe until World War II, although English guidebooks did not recommend it. In Poland, the mushroom was often eaten after pickling or salting. It was known to be a gastrointestinal irritant when ingested raw but had been presumed edible after cooking. Questions were first raised about its toxicity after German mycologist Julius Schäffer died after eating it in October 1944. About an hour after he and his wife ate a meal prepared with the mushrooms, Schäffer developed vomiting, diarrhea, and fever. His condition worsened to the point where he was admitted to hospital the following day and developed kidney failure, perishing after 17 days.

In the mid-1980s, Swiss physician René Flammer discovered an antigen within the mushroom that stimulates an autoimmune reaction causing the body's immune cells to consider its own red blood cells as foreign and attack them. Despite this, it was not until 1990 that guidebooks firmly warned against eating P. involutus, and one Italian guidebook recommended it as late as 1998. The relatively rare immunohemolytic syndrome occurs following the repeated ingestion of Paxillus mushrooms. Most commonly it arises when the person has ingested the mushroom for a long period of time, sometimes for many years, and has shown mild gastrointestinal symptoms on previous occasions. The Paxillus syndrome is better classed as a hypersensitivity reaction than a toxicological reaction as it is caused not by a genuinely poisonous substance but by the antigen in the mushroom. The antigen is still of unknown structure but it stimulates the formation of IgG antibodies in the blood serum. In the course of subsequent meals, antigen-antibody complexes are formed; these complexes attach to the surface of blood cells and eventually lead to their breakdown.

Poisoning symptoms are rapid in onset, consisting initially of vomiting, diarrhea, abdominal pain, and associated decreased blood volume. Shortly after these initial symptoms appear, hemolysis develops, resulting in reduced urine output, hemoglobin in the urine or outright absence of urine formation, and anemia. Medical laboratory tests consist of testing for the presence of increasing bilirubin and free hemoglobin, and falling haptoglobins. Hemolysis may lead to numerous complications including acute kidney injury, shock, acute respiratory failure, and disseminated intravascular coagulation. These complications can cause significant morbidity with fatalities having been reported.

There is no antidote for poisoning, only supportive treatment consisting of monitoring complete blood count, renal function, blood pressure, and fluid and electrolyte balance and correcting abnormalities. The use of corticosteroids may be a useful adjunct in treatment, as they protect blood cells against hemolysis, thereby reducing complications. Plasmapheresis reduces the circulating immune complexes in the blood which cause the hemolysis, and may be beneficial in improving the outcome. Additionally, hemodialysis can be used for patients with compromised kidney function or kidney failure.

Paxillus involutus also contains agents which appear to damage chromosomes; it is unclear whether these have carcinogenic or mutagenic potential. Two compounds that have been identified are the phenols involutone and involutin; the latter is responsible for the brownish discolouration upon bruising.

Despite the poisonings, Paxillus involutus is still consumed in parts of Poland, Russia, and Ukraine, where people die from it every year.

== See also ==
- List of deadly fungi
