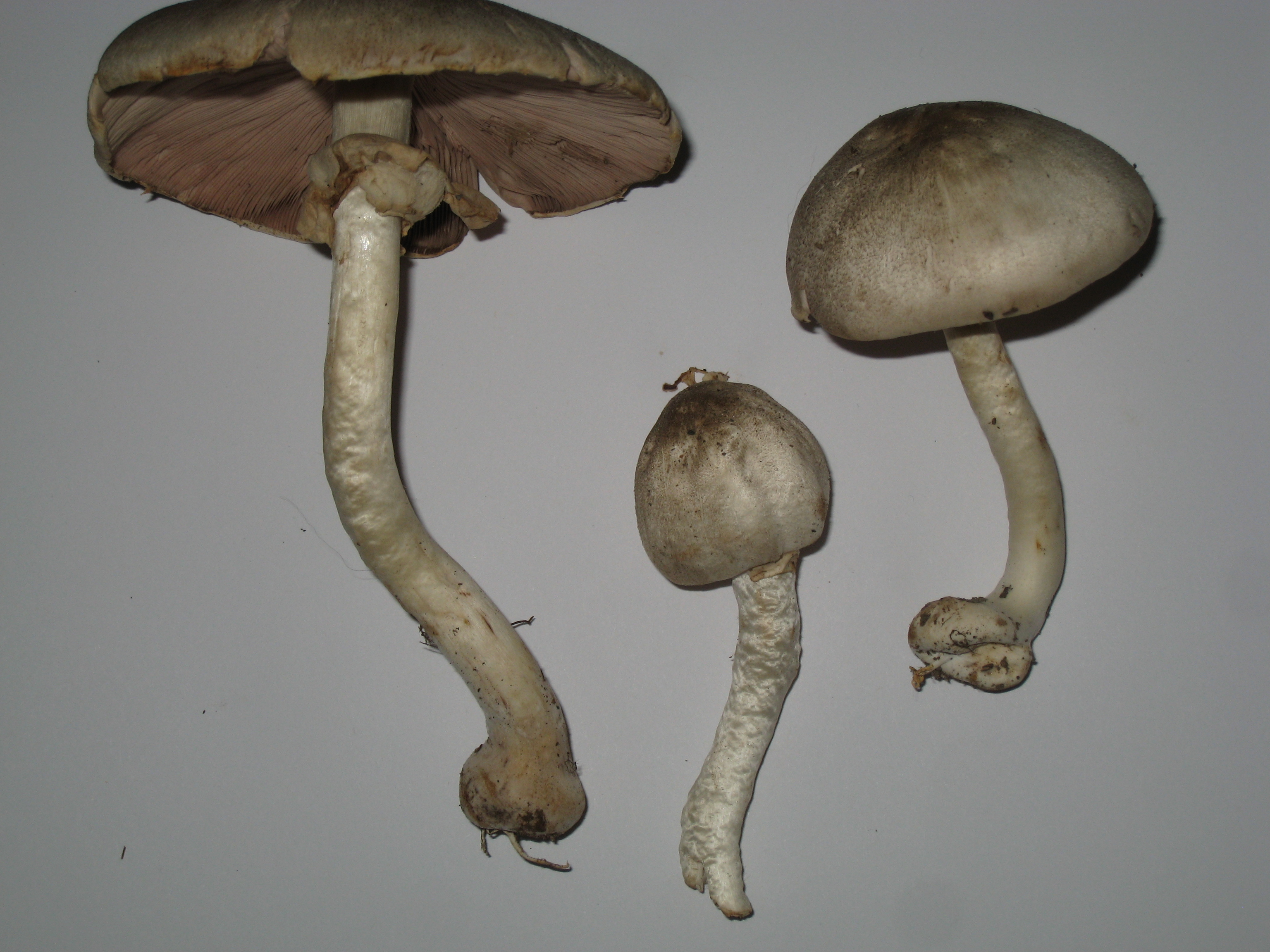

Scientific classification
- Kingdom: Fungi
- Division: Basidiomycota
- Class: Agaricomycetes
- Order: Agaricales
- Family: Agaricaceae
- Genus: Agaricus
- Species: A. placomyces

Binomial name
- Agaricus placomyces Peck (1878)

Synonyms
- Agaricus praeclaresquamosus A.E.Freeman 1979); Fungus placomyces (Peck) Kuntze (1898); Psalliota placomyces (Peck) Lloyd (1899)

= Agaricus placomyces =

Species of fungus

Agaricus placomyces
- Mycological characteristics
- Gills on hymenium
- Cap is convex or flat
- Hymenium is free
- Stipe has a ring
- Spore print is blackish-brown
- Ecology is saprotrophic
- Edibility is poisonous

Agaricus placomyces is a toxic basidiomycete fungus of the genus Agaricus. It is found in North America; the Eurasian populations formerly known by the same scientific name are nowadays known as A. moelleri, while the present species may also be referred to as A. praeclaresquamosus.

== Description ==
Agaricus placomyces has a cap that is 5–13 centimetres (2–5 in) wide and varies from convex to broadly convex or nearly flat in age. In addition, the surface of the cap is dry and covered with brownish fibers and scales, especially over the center. Underneath, the cap can be whitish under normal environments, or pinkish in wet weather. Covered with fine, appressed greyish-brown scales and concentrated at the disc, the cap is thick, slowly becoming vinaceous when injured; the odor smells of phenol. The flesh is white, and becomes yellow when placed in KOH.

The gills of this mushroom are free from the stem, crowded, and pale grayish-pink, turning brown in age. In addition, the stem is 6–15 cm long, 1–1.5 cm. thick and more or less equal, with an enlarged base (unlike typically ending in a small bulb like Agaricus pocillator). Also, it is fairly smooth, white and bruising yellow, especially at the base, with a persistent ring, and the partial veil when still covering the gills developing brownish to yellowish droplets.

At 8–15 cm long and 2–3.5 cm thick, the stipe is slightly enlarged at the base; the surface is white, and smooth above and below the ring. The veil of the stipe is membranous, thick, white, and forms a persistent ring with a smooth upper and lower surface. The base of the stipe is typically yellow when bruised and smells of phenol.

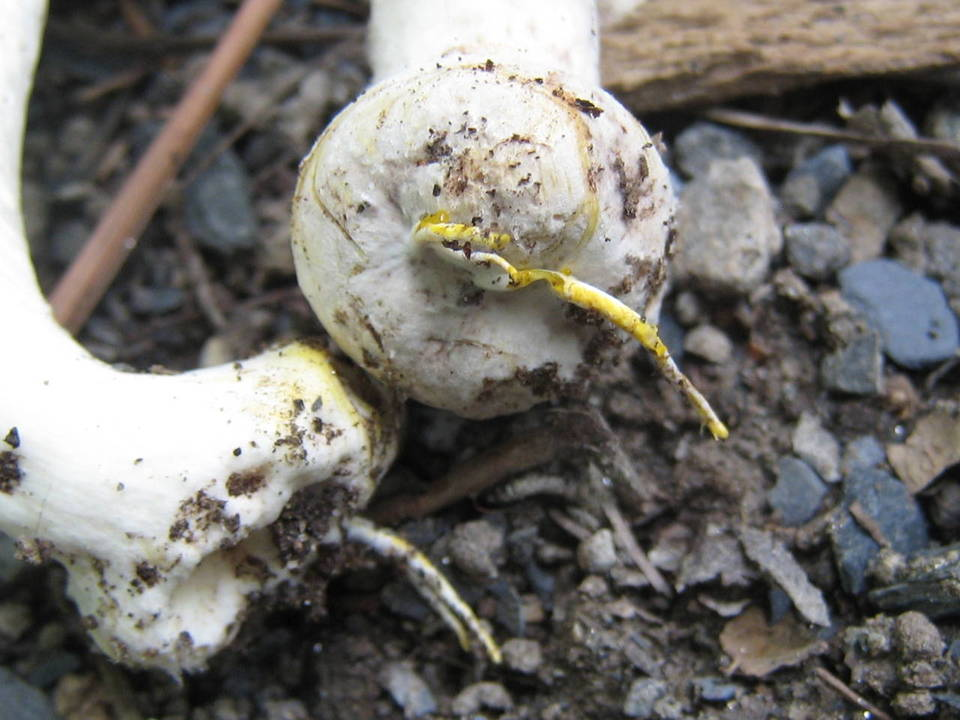
Yellow staining rhizomorphs at the base of A. placomyces specimens

The spores are 4–6.0 x 3.5–4.5 μm, smooth, and elliptical; the spore print is dark brown.

== Habitat and distribution ==
Agaricus placomyces is saprobic. In addition, it grows in groups under hardwoods and in mixed woods during summer and fall. It is generally found east of the Rocky Mountains and northern in distribution. Generally, it is solitary, living in either small groups, or clusters on disturbed ground under conifers. Unlike many other Agaricus species, it fruits from mid to late winter rather than during the late spring, summer and early fall. A. placomyces is found in the USA, Canada, Brazil, Chile, the UK, Australia, New Zeeland, and South Africa.

== Toxicity ==
Agaricus placomyces contains toxins which cause gastrointestinal upset, as with other phenolic-odored Agaricus species. Some people reportedly may not be affected. The mushroom's taste is mild and its odor resembles phenol or coal tar.

== Similar species ==
Several related species are difficult to distinguish visually. Agaricus pocillator and A. leptocaulis overlap in range, but the former is distinguished by the cup-like base while the latter has a narrower stipe and is typically lighter in color. A. deardorffensis, A. buckmacadooi, and A. berryessae appear similar, but are found on the Pacific coast.

== See also ==
- List of Agaricus species

== Sources ==
- mushroomexpert
- mykoweb
- rogermushrooms
