= Paxillus obscurisporus =

Scientific classification
- Kingdom: Fungi
- Division: Basidiomycota
- Class: Agaricomycetes
- Order: Boletales
- Family: Paxillaceae
- Genus: Paxillus
- Species: P. obscurisporus

Binomial name
- Paxillus obscurisporus C.Hahn (1999)

Synonyms
- Paxillus obscurosporus C.Hahn (1999)

Species of fungus

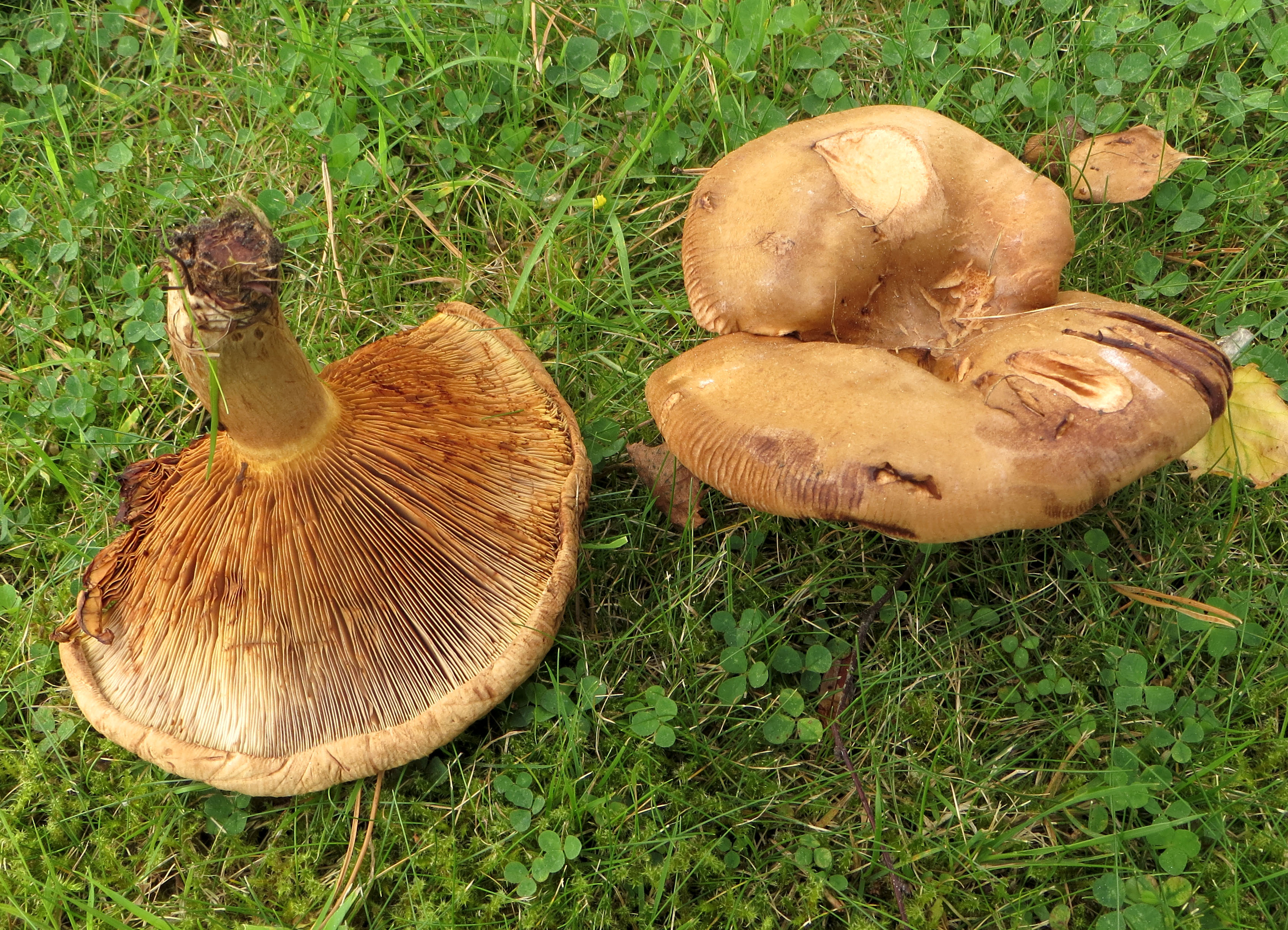
Paxillus obscurisporus

Paxillus obscurisporus is a basidiomycete fungus found in Europe. It was described as new to science in 1999. It was originally given the name P. obscurosporus which was later corrected to 'obscurisporus' . It is visually similar to the brown roll-rim (P. involutus) but can grow much larger, up to 29cm across.
