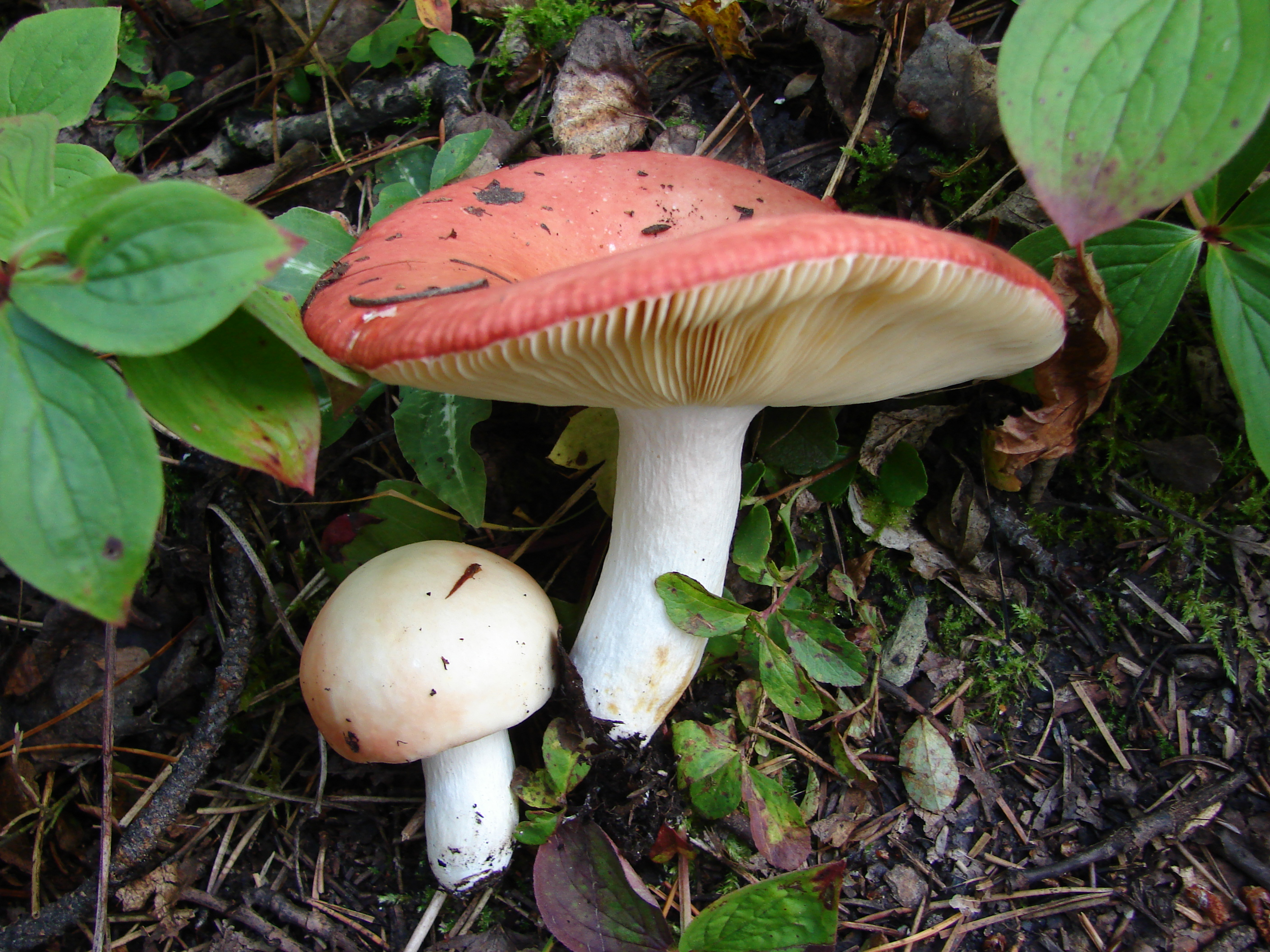

Scientific classification
- Domain: Eukaryota
- Kingdom: Fungi
- Division: Basidiomycota
- Class: Agaricomycetes
- Order: Russulales
- Family: Russulaceae
- Genus: Russula
- Species: R. laeta

Binomial name
- Russula laeta Jul. Schäff. (1952)

Synonyms
- Russula borealis Kauffman

= Russula laeta =

Species of fungus

Russula laeta is a brittle gill species that was first described by Julius Schäffer in 1952. This species is critically endangered in Belgium.
