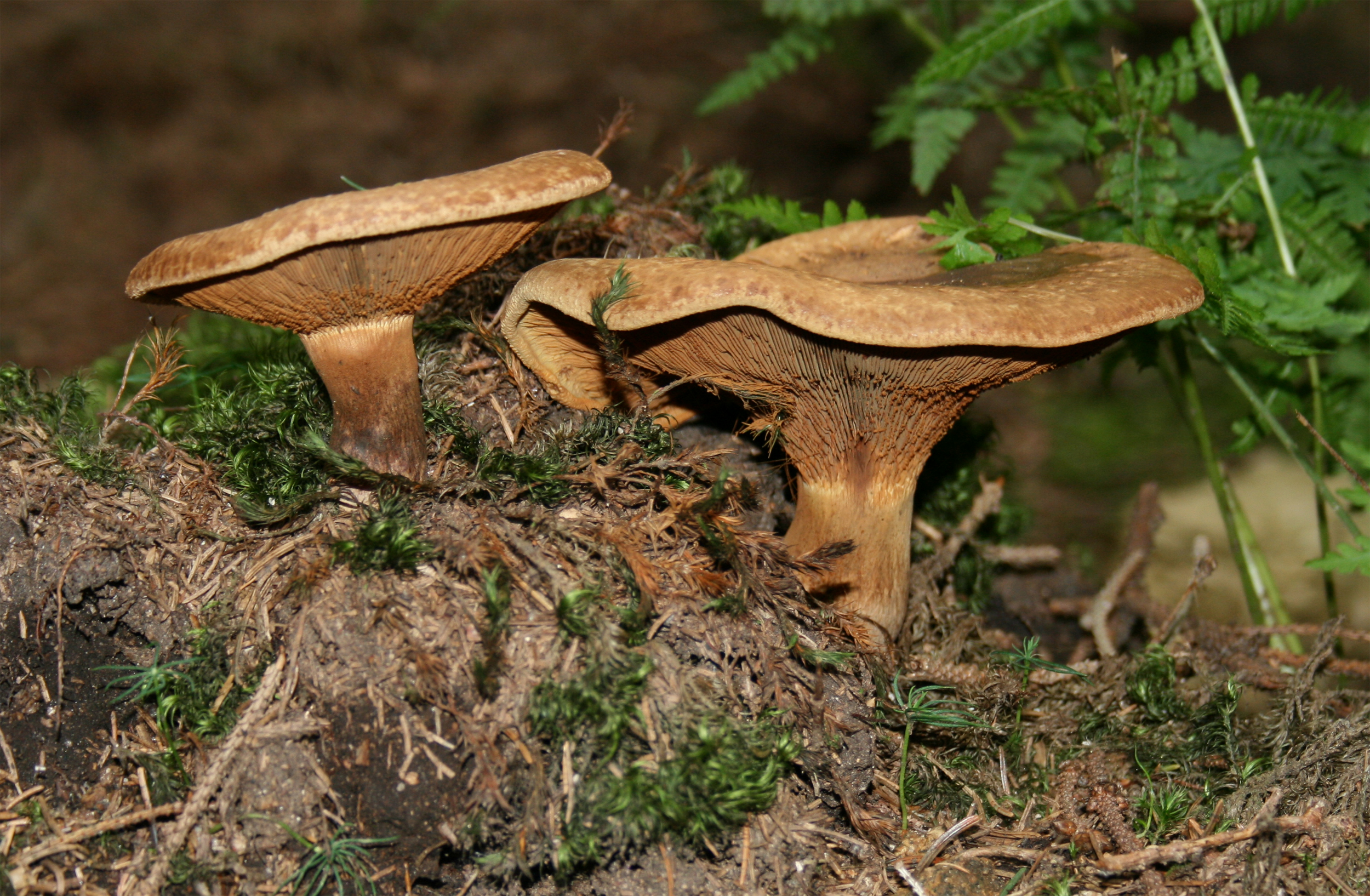
- P. involutus

Scientific classification
- Kingdom: Fungi
- Division: Basidiomycota
- Class: Agaricomycetes
- Order: Boletales
- Family: Paxillaceae
- Genus: Paxillus; Fr. (1835)

Type species
- Paxillus involutus (Batsch) Fr. (1838)

Diversity
- 36 species

Synonyms
- Ruthea Opat. (1836); Rhymovis Pers. ex Rabenh. (1844); Paxillopsis E.-J.Gilbert (1931); Parapaxillus Singer (1942)

= Paxillus =

Genus of fungi

Paxillus is a genus of mushrooms of which most are known to be poisonous or inedible. Species include Paxillus involutus and Paxillus vernalis. Two former species—Tapinella panuoides and Tapinella atrotomentosa—have now been transferred to the related genus Tapinella in the family Tapinellaceae.

Paxillus means small stake.

== Edibility ==
While this genus has in the past been erroneously considered edible, it is now known to be poisonous and has been linked to a number of recorded fatalities. The deadly poisonings appear to have been due to eating the mushrooms raw.

== Species ==
As of October 2018, Index Fungorum lists 38 valid species in Paxillus:

- Paxillus albidulus
- Paxillus amazonicus
- Paxillus ammoniavirescens
- Paxillus atraetopus
- Paxillus brunneotomentosus
- Paxillus chalybaeus
- Paxillus coffeaceus
- Paxillus cuprinus
- Paxillus defibulatus
- Paxillus fasciculatus
- Paxillus fechtneri
- Paxillus guttatus
- Paxillus gymnopus
- Paxillus hortensis
- Paxillus ianthinophyllus
- Paxillus involutus
- Paxillus ionipus
- Paxillus leoninus
- Paxillus maculatus
- Paxillus minutesquamulosus
- Paxillus obscurisporus
- Paxillus ochraceus
- Paxillus pahangensis
- Paxillus piperatus
- Paxillus polychrous
- Paxillus rhytidophyllus
- Paxillus robiniae
- Paxillus rubicundulus
- Paxillus scleropus
- Paxillus serbicus
- Paxillus squamosus
- Paxillus validus
- Paxillus velenovskyi
- Paxillus vernalis
- Paxillus yunnanensis
- Paxillus zerovae
