= Agaricus phaeolepidotus =

Scientific classification
- Kingdom: Fungi
- Division: Basidiomycota
- Class: Agaricomycetes
- Order: Agaricales
- Family: Agaricaceae
- Genus: Agaricus
- Species: A. phaeolepidotus

Binomial name
- Agaricus phaeolepidotus (F.H.Møller) F.H.Møller (1952)

Synonyms
- Psalliota phaeolepidota F.H.Møller (1952)

Species of fungus

Agaricus phaeolepidotus, the dusky scaled mushroom, is a species of fungus in the family Agaricaceae. A European species, the agaric was first described scientifically in 1952 by F.H.Møller.

== See also ==
- List of Agaricus species
