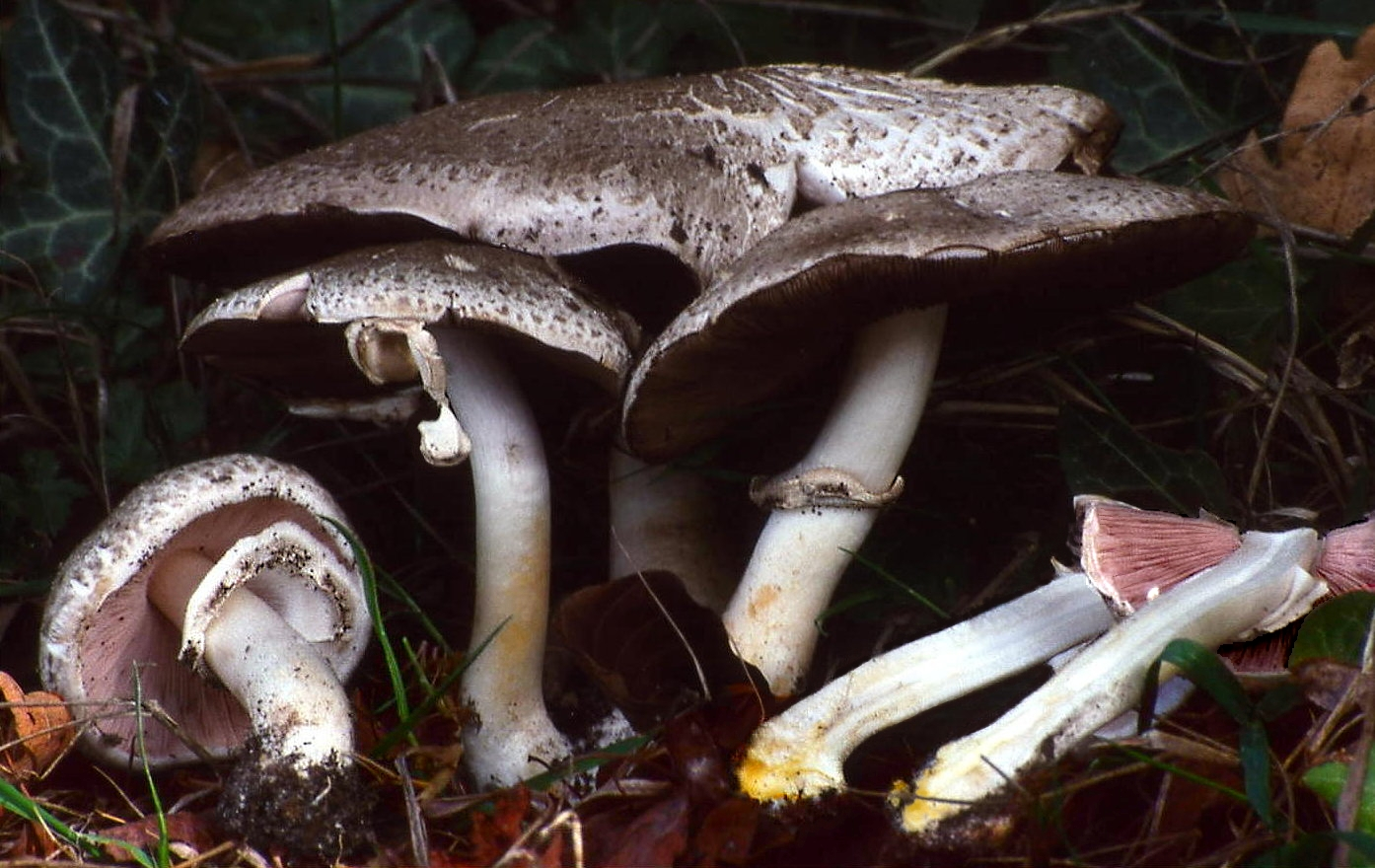

Scientific classification
- Kingdom: Fungi
- Division: Basidiomycota
- Class: Agaricomycetes
- Order: Agaricales
- Family: Agaricaceae
- Genus: Agaricus
- Species: A. moelleri

Binomial name
- Agaricus moelleri Wasser (1976)

Synonyms
- Agaricus meleagris Imbach (1946); Agaricus praeclaresquamosus Freeman (1979); Agaricus placomyces var. meleagris (Jul. Schäff.) M.M. Moser 1967; Agaricus placomyces var. meleagris (Jul. Schäff.) R. Pascual 1987

= Agaricus moelleri =

Species of fungus

Agaricus moelleri
- Mycological characteristics
- Gills on hymenium
- Cap is flat
- Hymenium is free
- Stipe has a ring
- Spore print is brown
- Ecology is saprotrophic
- Edibility is poisonous

Agaricus moelleri, commonly known as the inky mushroom, or dark scaled mushroom, is a large species of fungus in the genus Agaricus. It appears occasionally in most kinds of woodland, during late summer, in northern temperate zones.

== Taxonomy ==
For many years Agaricus moelleri was erroneously accredited with the binomial Agaricus placomyces by some British authors. The epithet placomyces was in fact given to a North American species of Agaricus by Charles Horton Peck in 1878 (now known as Agaricus praeclaresquamosus A.E.Freeman 1979). The current binomial Agaricus moelleri was published in 1976 by the Ukrainian mycologist Solomon P. Wasser.

== Description ==
The cap has a greyish-brown patch in the centre and cold grey-brown scaling on the surrounding off-white background. It is 5 to 9 centimetres (2 to 3 1/2 in) in diameter, and yellows when bruised. It is ovate when young, flattening later. The stem has a drooping ring and stains yellow very easily when bruised, this colour then changes to brown over time. The stem flesh bruises yellow only faintly, and is more noticeable in the base. The gills are crowded, and free, as is typical for an Agaricus. They are pink on young specimens, but brown to black on older fruit bodies. The flesh is white and does not change colour on cutting. It smells like ink, iodoform, phenol, sweat, or mouldy straw. The spores are 4–6 x 3–4 μm and are elliptical.

=== Similar species ===
Agaricus hondensis is similar, with a pinkish tint and firmer flesh.

A similar species occurring in North America, Agaricus praeclaresquamosus A.E. Freeman 1979 (flat-top agaricus) can grow up to 25 cm wide; it is a possible synonym.

The rare Agaricus phaeolepidotus also has the iodoform, or ink smell, but has browner cap scales, and stains yellow less readily.

== Distribution and habitat ==
Agaricus moelleri is found in the temperate zones of the Northern Hemisphere, including parts of North America, Europe (including Britain), and Asia. It grows in mixed forests and woods. It is widespread, but can be locally rare, and favors rich alkaline woodland, or parkland.

== Toxicity ==
In the same fashion as the yellow stainer (Agaricus xanthodermus), Agaricus moelleri can produce gastrointestinal symptoms for some people but not others, when ingested. It is considered toxic.

== See also ==
- List of Agaricus species
