= List of Agaricus species =

The fungal genus Agaricus as late as 2008 was believed to contain about 200 species worldwide. Since then, molecular phylogenetic studies have revalidated several disputed species, as well as resolved some species complexes, and aided in discovery and description of a wide range of mostly tropical species that were formerly unknown to science. As of 2020, the genus is believed to contain no fewer than 400 species, and possibly many more.

The medicinal mushroom known in Japan as Echigoshirayukidake (越後白雪茸) was initially also thought to be an Agaricus, either a subspecies of Agaricus "blazei" (i.e. A. subrufescens), or a new species. It was eventually identified as sclerotium of the crust-forming bark fungus Ceraceomyces tessulatus, which is not particularly closely related to Agaricus.

Several secotioid (puffball-like) fungi have in recent times be recognized as highly aberrant members of Agaricus, and are now included here. These typically inhabit deserts where few fungi – and even fewer of the familiar cap-and-stalk mushroom shape – grow. Another desert species, A. zelleri, was erroneously placed in the present genus and is now known as Gyrophragmium californicum. In addition, the scientific names Agaricus and – even more so – Psalliota were historically often used as a "wastebasket taxon" for any and all similar mushrooms, regardless of their actual relationships.

== Key ==
- Edible
- Choice
- Deadly
- Poisonous
- Unknown
- Caution/Allergic
- Inedible

== Species ==
Species either confirmed or suspected to belong into this genus include:

- Agaricus abramsii
- Agaricus abruptibulbus – abruptly-bulbous agaricus, flat-bulb mushroom (disputed)
- Agaricus aestivalis
- Agaricus agrinferus (disputed)
- Agaricus agrocyboides
- Agaricus alabamensis
- Agaricus alachuanus
- Agaricus albidoperonatus
- Agaricus albertii Bon (1988) (disputed)
- Agaricus alboargillascens
- Agaricus alboides
- Agaricus albolutescens (disputed)
- Agaricus albosanguineus
- Agaricus albosquamosus
- Agaricus alligator
- Agaricus altipes Møller (often united with A.aestivalis)
- Agaricus amanitiformis
- Agaricus amicosus
- Agaricus amoenomyces
- Agaricus amoenus
- Agaricus andrewii Freeman
- Agaricus angelicus
- Agaricus angusticystidiatus
- Agaricus anisarius
- Agaricus annae
- Agaricus annulospecialis
- Agaricus approximans
- Agaricus arcticus
- Agaricus argenteopurpureus
- Agaricus argenteus
- Agaricus argentinus
- Agaricus argyropotamicus
- Agaricus argyrotectus
- Agaricus aridicola Geml, Geiser & Royse (2004) (formerly in Gyrophragmium)
- Agaricus aristocratus
- Agaricus arizonicus
- Agaricus armandomyces
- Agaricus arorae
- Agaricus arrillagarum
- Agaricus arvensis – horse mushroom
- Agaricus atrodiscus
- Agaricus augustus – the prince
- Agaricus aurantioviolaceus
- Agaricus auresiccescens
- Agaricus australiensis
- Agaricus austrovinaceus
- Agaricus azoetes
- Agaricus babosiae
- Agaricus badioniveus
- Agaricus bajan-agtensis
- Agaricus balchaschensis
- Agaricus bambusae
- Agaricus bambusophilus
- Agaricus basianulosus
- Agaricus beelii
- Agaricus bellanniae
- Agaricus benesii
- Agaricus benzodorus
- Agaricus bernardii – salt-loving mushroom
- Agaricus bernardiiformis (disputed)
- Agaricus berryessae
- Agaricus biannulatus Mua, L.A.Parra, Cappelli & Callac (2012) (Europe)
- Agaricus biberi
- Agaricus bicortinatellus
- Agaricus bilamellatus
- Agaricus bingensis
- Agaricus bisporatus
- Agaricus bisporiticus (Asia)
- Agaricus bisporus – cultivated/button/portobello mushroom (includes A.brunnescens)
- Agaricus bitorquis – pavement mushroom, banded agaric
- Agaricus bivelatoides
- Agaricus bivelatus
- Agaricus blatteus
- Agaricus blazei Murrill (often confused with A. subrufescens)
- Agaricus blockii
- Agaricus bobosi
- Agaricus bohusianus L.A.Parra (2005) (Europe)
- Agaricus bohusii
- Agaricus boisseletii
- Agaricus boltonii
- Agaricus bonii
- Agaricus bonussquamulosus
- Agaricus braendlei
- Agaricus brasiliensis Fr. (often confused with A. subrufescens)
- Agaricus bresadolanus
- Agaricus bruchii
- Agaricus brunneofibrillosus (formerly in A. fuscofibrillosus)
- Agaricus brunneofulva
- Agaricus brunneofulvus
- Agaricus brunneolus (disputed)
- Agaricus brunneopictus
- Agaricus brunneopilatus
- Agaricus brunneosquamulosus
- Agaricus brunneostictus
- Agaricus buckmacadooi
- Agaricus bugandensis
- Agaricus bukavuensis
- Agaricus bulbillosus
- Agaricus burkillii
- Agaricus butyreburneus
- Agaricus caballeroi L.A.Parra, G.Muñoz & Callac (2014) (Spain)
- Agaricus caesifolius
- Agaricus californicus – California agaricus
- Agaricus callacii
- Agaricus calongei
- Agaricus campbellensis
- Agaricus campestris – field/meadow mushroom
- Agaricus campestroides
- Agaricus campigenus
- Agaricus candidolutescens
- Agaricus candussoi
- Agaricus capensis
- Agaricus cappellianus
- Agaricus cappellii
- Agaricus caribaeus
- Agaricus carminescens
- Agaricus carminostictus
- Agaricus caroli
- Agaricus catenariocystidiosus
- Agaricus catenatus
- Agaricus cellaris
- Agaricus cervinifolius
- Agaricus cerinupileus
- Agaricus chacoensis
- Agaricus chartaceus
- Agaricus cheilotulus
- Agaricus chiangmaiensis
- Agaricus chionodermus
- Agaricus chlamydopus
- Agaricus chryseus
- Agaricus cinnamomellus
- Agaricus circumtectus
- Agaricus ciscoensis
- Agaricus citrinidiscus
- Agaricus coccyginus
- Agaricus collegarum
- Agaricus colpeteii
- Agaricus columellatus (formerly in Araneosa)
- Agaricus comptuloides
- Agaricus comtulellus
- Agaricus comtuliformis
- Agaricus comtulus
- Agaricus coniferarum
- Agaricus cordillerensis
- Agaricus crassisquamosus
- Agaricus cretacellus
- Agaricus cretaceus
- Agaricus croceolutescens
- Agaricus crocodilinus
- Agaricus crocopeplus
- Agaricus cruciquercorum
- Agaricus cuniculicola
- Agaricus cupreobrunneus – brown field mushroom
- Agaricus cupressicola
- Agaricus cupressophilus Kerrigan (2008) (California)
- Agaricus curanilahuensis
- Agaricus cylindriceps
- Agaricus deardorffensis
- Agaricus dennisii
- Agaricus depauperatus
- Agaricus deplanatus
- Agaricus deserticola G.Moreno, Esqueda & Lizárraga (2010) – gasteroid agaricus (formerly in Longula)
- Agaricus desjardinii
- Agaricus devoniensis
- Agaricus diamantanus
- Agaricus dicystis
- Agaricus didymus
- Agaricus dilatostipes
- Agaricus dilutibrunneus
- Agaricus diminutivus
- Agaricus dimorphosquamatus
- Agaricus diobensis
- Agaricus diospyros
- Agaricus dolichopus
- Agaricus ducheminii
- Agaricus dulcidulus – rosy wood mushroom (sometimes in A.semotus)
- Agaricus duplocingulatus
- Agaricus ealaensis
- Agaricus earlei
- Agaricus eastlandensis
- Agaricus eburneocanus
- Agaricus edmondoi
- Agaricus elfinensis
- Agaricus elongatestipes
- Agaricus eludens
- Agaricus endoxanthus
- Agaricus entibigae
- Agaricus erectosquamosus
- Agaricus erindalensis
- Agaricus erythrosarx
- Agaricus erythrotrichus
- Agaricus essettei (disputed)
- Agaricus eutheloides
- Agaricus evertens
- Agaricus excellens (disputed)
- Agaricus exilissimus
- Agaricus eximius
- Agaricus fiardii
- Agaricus fibuloides
- Agaricus ficophilus
- Agaricus fimbrimarginatus
- Agaricus fissuratus
- Agaricus flammicolor
- Agaricus flavicentrus
- Agaricus flavidodiscus
- Agaricus flavistipus
- Agaricus flavitingens
- Agaricus flavopileatus
- Agaricus flavotingens
- Agaricus flocculosipes
- Agaricus floridanus
- Agaricus fontanae
- Agaricus fragilivolvatus
- Agaricus freirei
- Agaricus friesianus
- Agaricus fulvoaurantiacus
- Agaricus fuscofolius
- Agaricus fuscopunctatus (Thailand)
- Agaricus fuscovelatus
- Agaricus gastronevadensis
- Agaricus gemellatus
- Agaricus gemlii
- Agaricus gemloides
- Agaricus gennadii
- Agaricus gilvus
- Agaricus glaber
- Agaricus glabrus
- Agaricus globocystidiatus
- Agaricus globosporus
- Agaricus goossensiae
- Agaricus grandiomyces
- Agaricus granularis
- Agaricus gratolens
- Agaricus greigensis
- Agaricus greuteri
- Agaricus griseicephalus
- Agaricus griseopunctatus
- Agaricus griseorimosus
- Agaricus griseovinaceus
- Agaricus guachari
- Agaricus guidottii
- Agaricus haematinus
- Agaricus haematosarcus
- Agaricus hahashimensis
- Agaricus halophilus
- Agaricus hannonii
- Agaricus hanthanaensis
- Agaricus heimii
- Agaricus heinemannianus
- Agaricus heinemanniensis
- Agaricus heinemannii
- Agaricus herinkii
- Agaricus herradurensis
- Agaricus heterocystis
- Agaricus hillii
- Agaricus hispidissimus
- Agaricus hondensis – felt-ringed agaricus
- Agaricus horakianus
- Agaricus horakii
- Agaricus hornei
- Agaricus hortensis
- Agaricus huijsmanii Courtec. (2008)
- Agaricus hupohanae
- Agaricus hypophaeus
- Agaricus iesu-et-marthae
- Agaricus ignicolor
- Agaricus ignobilis
- Agaricus impudicus – tufted wood mushroom
- Agaricus inapertus (formerly in Endoptychum)
- Agaricus incultorum
- Agaricus indistinctus
- Agaricus inedulis
- Agaricus infelix
- Agaricus infidus (disputed)
- Agaricus inilleasper
- Agaricus inoxydabilis
- Agaricus inthanonensis
- Agaricus iocephalopsis
- Agaricus iodolens
- Agaricus iodosmus
- Agaricus iranicus
- Agaricus jacarandae
- Agaricus jacobi
- Agaricus jezoensis
- Agaricus jingningensis
- Agaricus jodoformicus
- Agaricus johnstonii
- Agaricus julius
- Agaricus junquitensis
- Agaricus kai
- Agaricus kauffmanii
- Agaricus kerriganii
- Agaricus kiawetes
- Agaricus kipukae
- Agaricus kivuensis
- Agaricus koelerionensis
- Agaricus kriegeri
- Agaricus kroneanus
- Agaricus kuehnerianus
- Agaricus kunmingensis
- Agaricus lacrymabunda
- Agaricus laeticulus
- Agaricus lamellidistans
- Agaricus lamelliperditus
- Agaricus lanatoniger
- Agaricus lanatorubescens
- Agaricus langei (= A.fuscofibrillosus)
- Agaricus lanipedisimilis
- Agaricus lanipes – European princess
- Agaricus laparrae
- Agaricus laskibarii
- Agaricus lateriticolor
- Agaricus leptocaulis
- Agaricus leptomeleagris
- Agaricus leucocarpus
- Agaricus leucolepidotus
- Agaricus leucotrichus Møller (disputed)
- Agaricus lignophilus
- Agaricus lilaceps – giant cypress agaricus
- Agaricus linzhinensis
- Agaricus litoralis – coastal mushroom (includes A.spissicaulis)
- Agaricus litoraloides
- Agaricus lividonitidus
- Agaricus lodgeae
- Agaricus lotenensis
- Agaricus lucifugus
- Agaricus ludovicii
- Agaricus lusitanicus
- Agaricus luteofibrillosus
- Agaricus luteoflocculosus
- Agaricus luteomaculatus
- Agaricus luteopallidus
- Agaricus luteotactus
- Agaricus lutosus
- Agaricus luzonensis
- Agaricus maclovianus
- Agaricus macmurphyi
- Agaricus macrocarpus
- Agaricus macrolepis (Pilát & Pouzar) Boisselet & Courtec. (2008)
- Agaricus macrosporus (disputed)
- Agaricus macrosporoides
- Agaricus magni
- Agaricus magniceps
- Agaricus magnivelaris
- Agaricus maiusculus
- Agaricus malangelus
- Agaricus maleolens
- Agaricus mangaoensis
- Agaricus manilensis
- Agaricus marisae
- Agaricus martineziensis
- Agaricus martinicensis
- Agaricus maskae
- Agaricus masoalensis
- Agaricus matrum
- Agaricus medio-fuscus
- Agaricus megacystidiatus
- Agaricus megalosporus
- Agaricus meijeri
- Agaricus melanosporus
- Agaricus menieri
- Agaricus merrillii
- Agaricus mesocarpus
- Agaricus microchlamidus
- Agaricus micromegathus
- Agaricus microspermus
- Agaricus microviolaceus
- Agaricus microvolvatulus
- Agaricus midnapurensis
- Agaricus minimus
- Agaricus minorpurpureus
- Agaricus moelleri – inky/dark-scaled mushroom (formerly in A.placomyces, includes A.meleagris)
- Agaricus moellerianus
- Agaricus moelleroides
- Agaricus moronii
- Agaricus multipunctum
- Agaricus murinocephalus (Thailand)
- Agaricus nanaugustus Kerrigan
- Agaricus nebularum
- Agaricus neimengguensis
- Agaricus nemoricola
- Agaricus nevoi
- Agaricus nigrescentibus
- Agaricus nigrobrunnescens
- Agaricus nigrogracilis
- Agaricus nitidipes
- Agaricus niveogranulatus
- Agaricus niveolutescens
- Agaricus nivescens
- Agaricus nobelianus
- Agaricus nothofagorum
- Agaricus novoguineensis
- Agaricus ochraceidiscus
- Agaricus ochraceosquamulosus
- Agaricus ochrascens
- Agaricus oenotrichus
- Agaricus oligocystis
- Agaricus olivellus
- Agaricus ornatipes
- Agaricus osecanus
- Agaricus pachydermus
- Agaricus padanus
- Agaricus pallens
- Agaricus pallidobrunneus
- Agaricus pampeanus
- Agaricus panziensis
- Agaricus parasilvaticus
- Agaricus parasubrutilescens
- Agaricus parvibicolor
- Agaricus parvitigrinus
- Agaricus patialensis
- Agaricus patris
- Agaricus pattersoniae
- Agaricus pearsonii
- Agaricus peligerinus
- Agaricus pequinii
- Agaricus perdicinus
- Agaricus perfuscus
- Agaricus perobscurus – American princess
- Agaricus perrarus
- Agaricus perturbans
- Agaricus petchii
- Agaricus phaeocyclus
- Agaricus phaeolepidotus
- Agaricus phaeoxanthus
- Agaricus pietatis
- Agaricus pilatianus
- Agaricus pilosporus
- Agaricus placomyces (includes A.praeclaresquamosus)
- Agaricus planipileus
- Agaricus pleurocystidiatus
- Agaricus pocillator
- Agaricus porosporus
- Agaricus porphyrizon
- Agaricus porphyrocephalus Møller
- Agaricus porphyropos
- Agaricus posadensis
- Agaricus praefoliatus
- Agaricus praemagniceps
- Agaricus praemagnus
- Agaricus praerimosus
- Agaricus pratensis
- Agaricus pratulorum
- Agaricus projectellus
- Agaricus proserpens
- Agaricus pseudoargentinus
- Agaricus pseudoaugustus
- Agaricus pseudocomptulus
- Agaricus pseudolangei
- Agaricus pseudolutosus
- Agaricus pseudomuralis
- Agaricus pseudoniger
- Agaricus pseudopallens
- Agaricus pseudoplacomyces
- Agaricus pseudopratensis
- Agaricus pseudopurpurellus
- Agaricus pseudoumbrella
- Agaricus pulcherrimus
- Agaricus pulverotectus
- Agaricus punjabensis
- Agaricus purpurellus
- Agaricus purpureofibrillosus
- Agaricus purpureoniger
- Agaricus purpureosquamulosus
- Agaricus purpurlesquameus
- Agaricus putidus
- Agaricus puttemansii
- Agaricus radicatus (disputed)
- Agaricus reducibulbus
- Agaricus rhoadsii
- Agaricus rhopalopodius
- Agaricus riberaltensis
- Agaricus robustulus
- Agaricus robynsianus
- Agaricus rodmanii
- Agaricus rollanii
- Agaricus romagnesii (disputed)
- Agaricus rosalamellatus
- Agaricus roseocingulatus
- Agaricus rotalis (disputed)
- Agaricus rubellus
- Agaricus rubronanus Kerrigan (1985) (San Mateo county)
- Agaricus rubribrunnescens
- Agaricus rufoaurantiacus
- Agaricus rufolanosus
- Agaricus rufotegulis
- Agaricus rufuspileus
- Agaricus rusiophyllus
- Agaricus rutilescens
- Agaricus salicophilus
- Agaricus sandianus
- Agaricus santacatalinensis
- Agaricus sceptonymus
- Agaricus scitulus
- Agaricus semotellus
- Agaricus semotus
- Agaricus sequoiae (Mendocino County, CA, under coast redwood)
- Agaricus shaferi
- Agaricus silvaticus – scaly/blushing wood mushroom, pinewood mushroom (= A.sylvaticus, includes A.haemorrhoidarius)
- Agaricus silvicola – wood mushroom (= A.sylvicola)
- Agaricus silvicolae-similis
- Agaricus silvipluvialis
- Agaricus simillimus
- Agaricus singaporensis
- Agaricus singeri
- Agaricus sinodeliciosus
- Agaricus sipapuensis
- Agaricus slovenicus
- Agaricus smithii
- Agaricus sodalis
- Agaricus solidipes Peck, Bull (1904)
- Agaricus sordido-ochraceus
- Agaricus sordidocarpus
- Agaricus spegazzinianus
- Agaricus stadii
- Agaricus stellatus-cuticus
- Agaricus sterilomarginatus
- Agaricus sterlingii
- Agaricus stevensii
- Agaricus stigmaticus Courtec. (2008)
- Agaricus stijvei
- Agaricus stramineus
- Agaricus subalachuanus
- Agaricus subantarcticus
- Agaricus subareolatus
- Agaricus subarvensis
- Agaricus subcoeruleus
- Agaricus subcomtulus
- Agaricus subedulis
- Agaricus subflabellatus
- Agaricus subfloccosus
- Agaricus subfloridanus
- Agaricus subgibbosus
- Agaricus subhortensis
- Agaricus subnitens
- Agaricus subochraceosquamulosus
- Agaricus suboreades
- Agaricus subperonatus (disputed)
- Agaricus subplacomyces-badius
- Agaricus subponderosus
- Agaricus subpratensis
- Agaricus subrufescens (includes A.rufotegulis, often confused with A.blazei and A.brasiliensis) – almond mushroom, royal sun agaricus, and various fanciful names
- Agaricus subrufescentoides
- Agaricus subrutilescens – wine-colored agaricus
- Agaricus subsaharianus L.A.Parra, Hama & De Kesel (2010)
- Agaricus subsilvicola
- Agaricus subsquamuliferus
- Agaricus subsubensis Kerrigan (2008) (California)
- Agaricus subtilipes
- Agaricus subvariabilis
- Agaricus sulcatellus
- Agaricus sulphureiceps
- Agaricus summensis Kerrigan (1985)
- Agaricus suthepensis
- Agaricus taculensis
- Agaricus taeniatimpictus
- Agaricus taeniatus
- Agaricus tantulus
- Agaricus tennesseensis
- Agaricus tenuivolvatus
- Agaricus tephrolepidus
- Agaricus termiticola
- Agaricus termitum
- Agaricus thiersii
- Agaricus thujae
- Agaricus tibetensis
- Agaricus tlaxcalensis Callac & G.Mata (2008) (Tlaxcala)
- Agaricus tollocanensis
- Agaricus toluenolens
- Agaricus trinitatensis
- Agaricus trisulphuratus (formerly in Cystoagaricus)
- Agaricus trutinatus
- Agaricus tucumanensis
- Agaricus tytthocarpus
- Agaricus umboninotus
- Agaricus unguentolens
- Agaricus unitinctus
- Agaricus urinascens
- Agaricus valdiviae
- Agaricus vaporarius
- Agaricus variabilicolor
- Agaricus variegans
- Agaricus variicystis
- Agaricus valdiviae
- Agaricus velenovskyi
- Agaricus veluticeps
- Agaricus venus
- Agaricus vinaceovirens (San Francisco Peninsula)
- Agaricus vinosobrunneofumidus
- Agaricus viridarius
- Agaricus viridopurpurascens
- Agaricus volvatulus
- Agaricus wariatodes
- Agaricus weberianus
- Agaricus wilmotii
- Agaricus woodrowii
- Agaricus wrightii
- Agaricus xanthodermoides
- Agaricus xanthodermulus
- Agaricus xanthodermus – yellow-staining mushroom
- Agaricus xantholepis
- Agaricus xanthosarcus
- Agaricus xeretes
- Agaricus xuchilensis
- Agaricus yunnanensis
- Agaricus zelleri

== Gallery ==
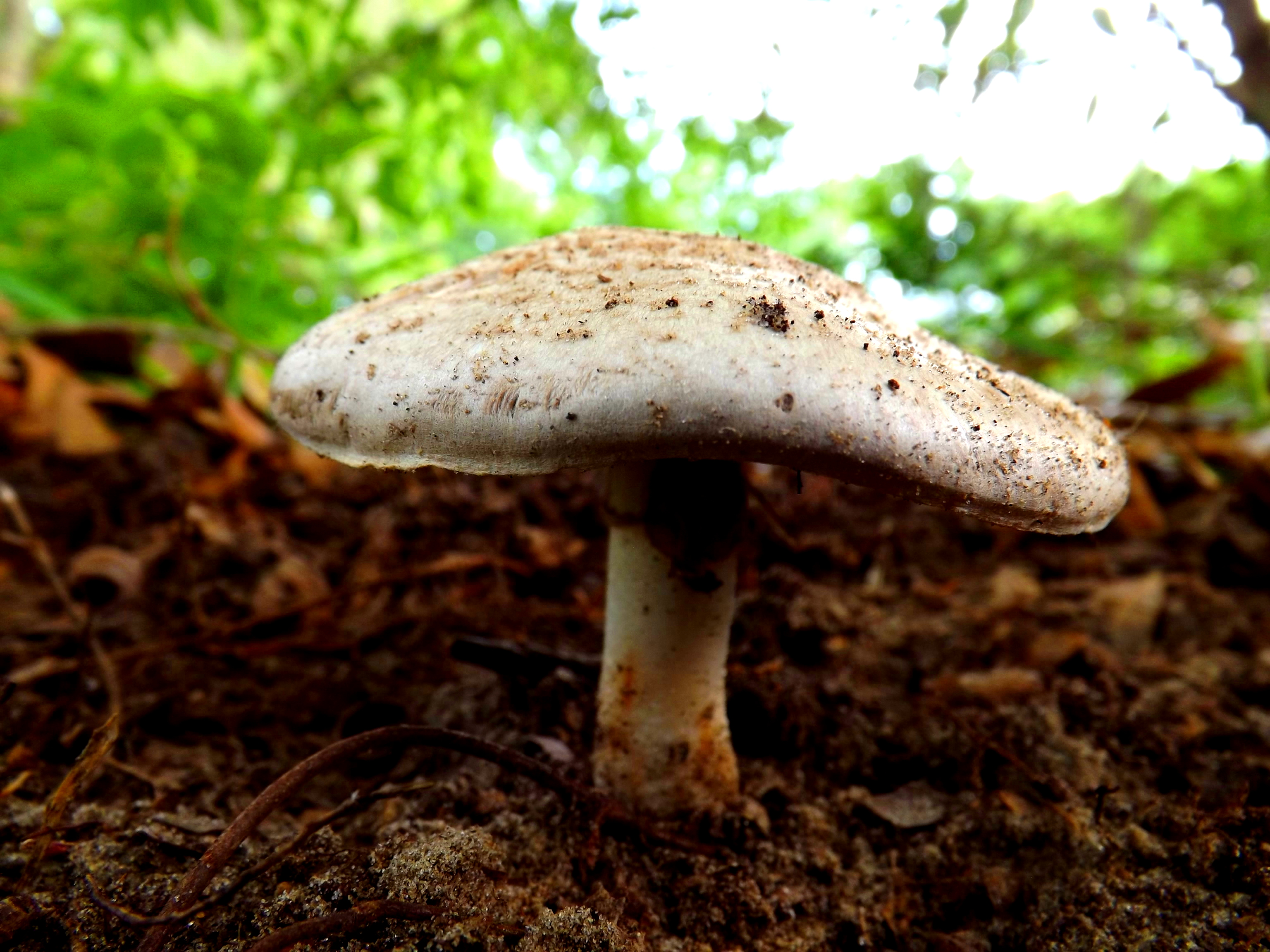
Agaricus alligator Murrill 1945

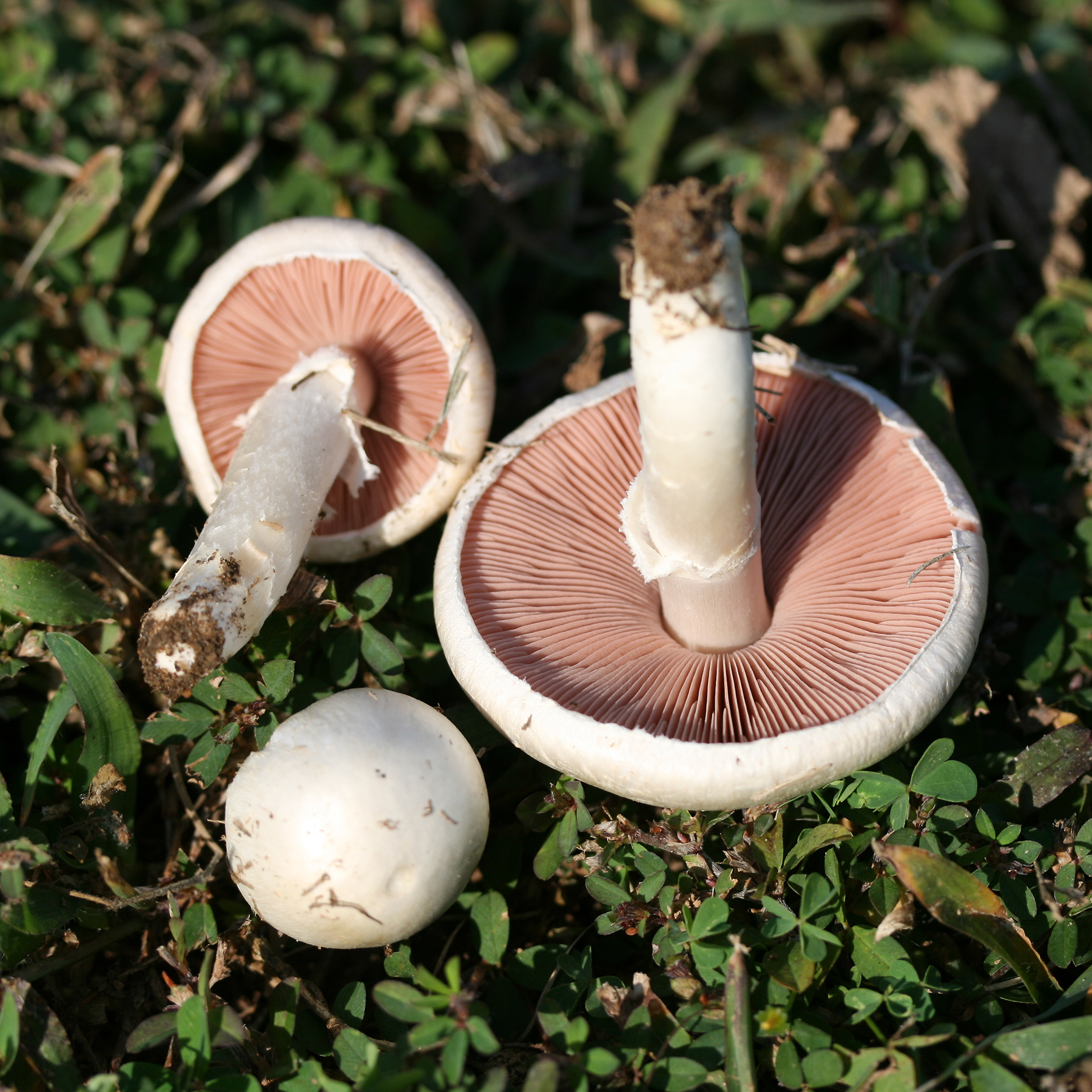
Agaricus andrewii A.E.Freeman 1979

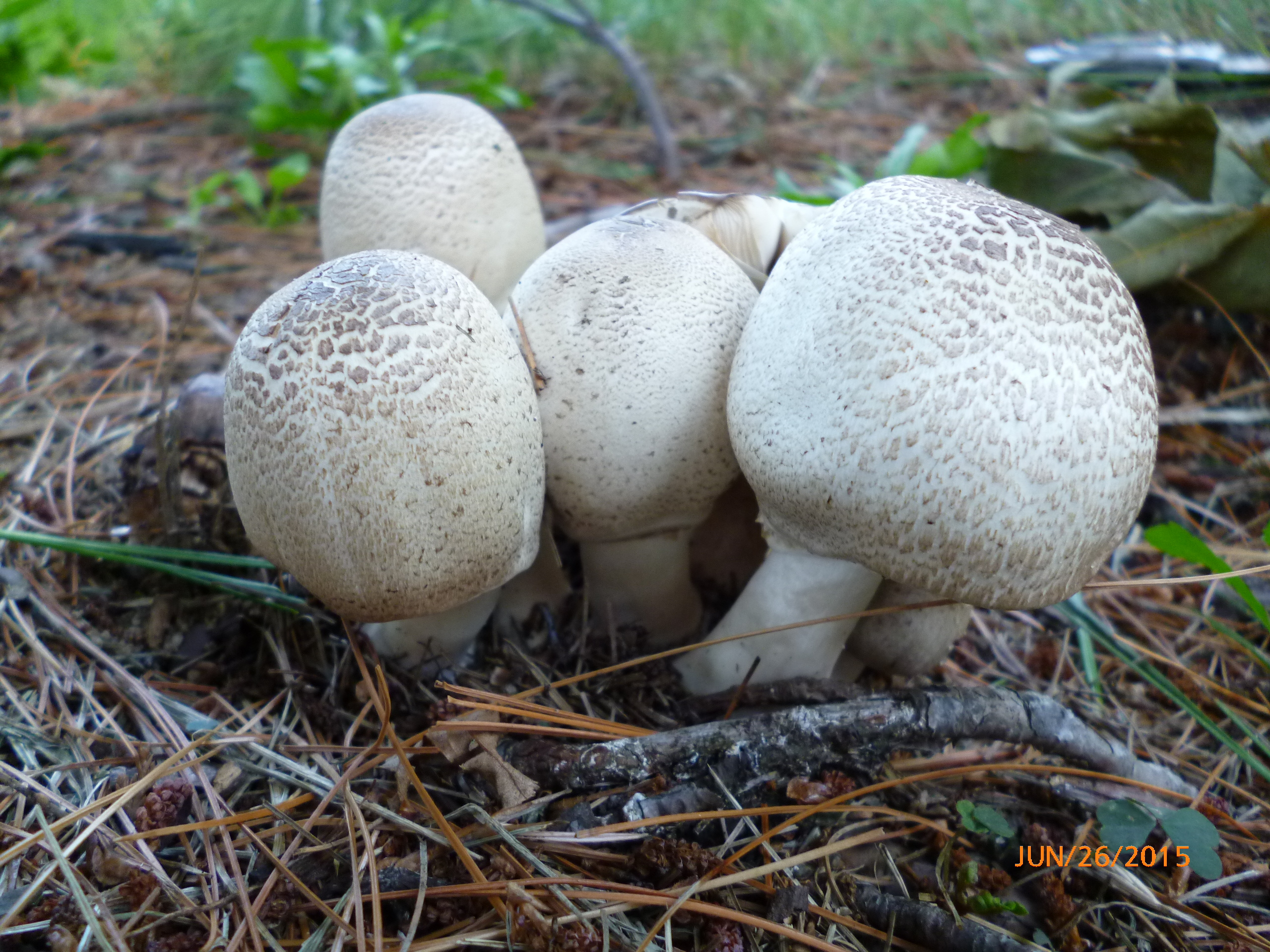
Agaricus approximans Peck 1909

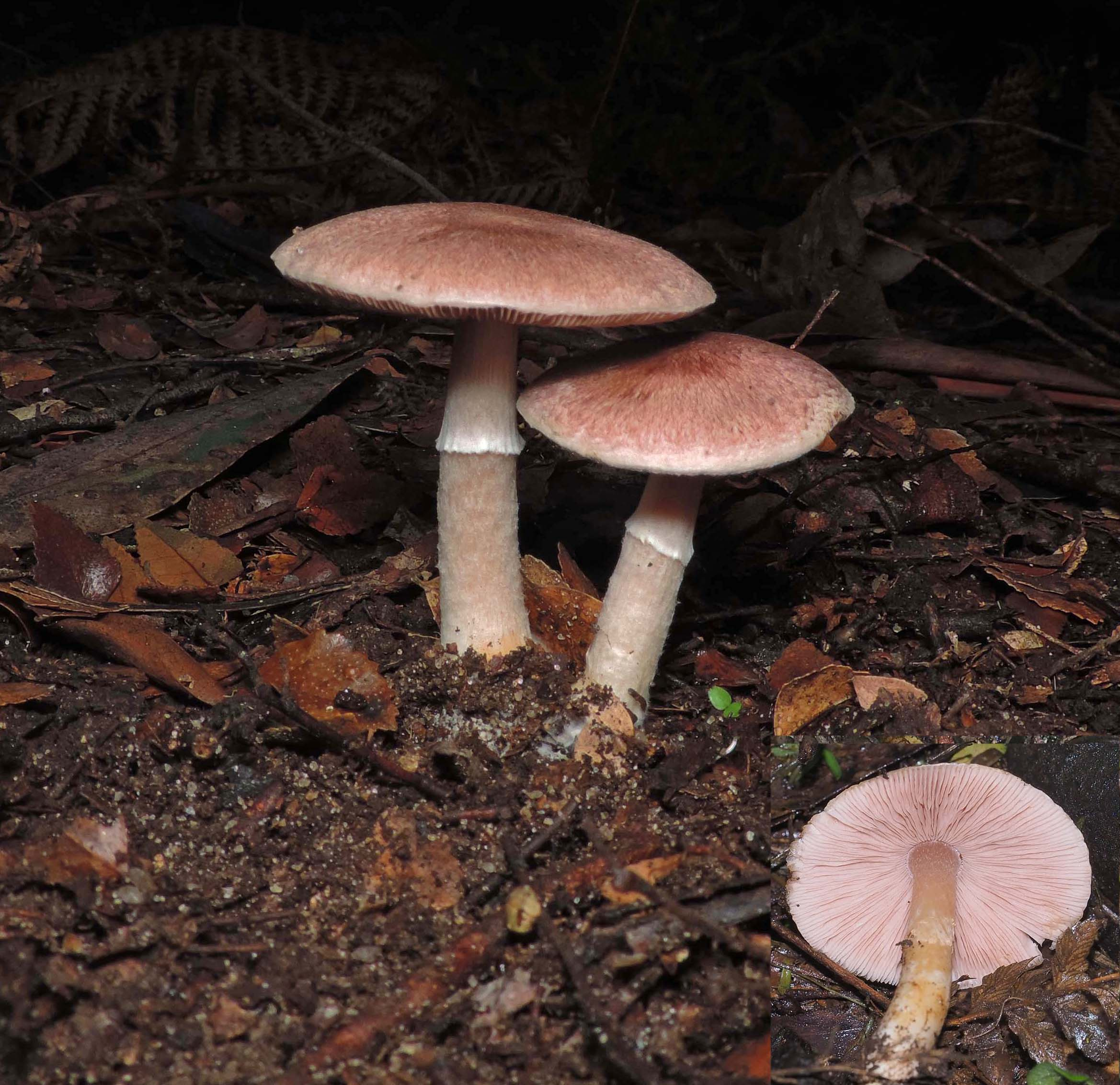
Agaricus austrovinaceus Grgur. & T.W.May 1997

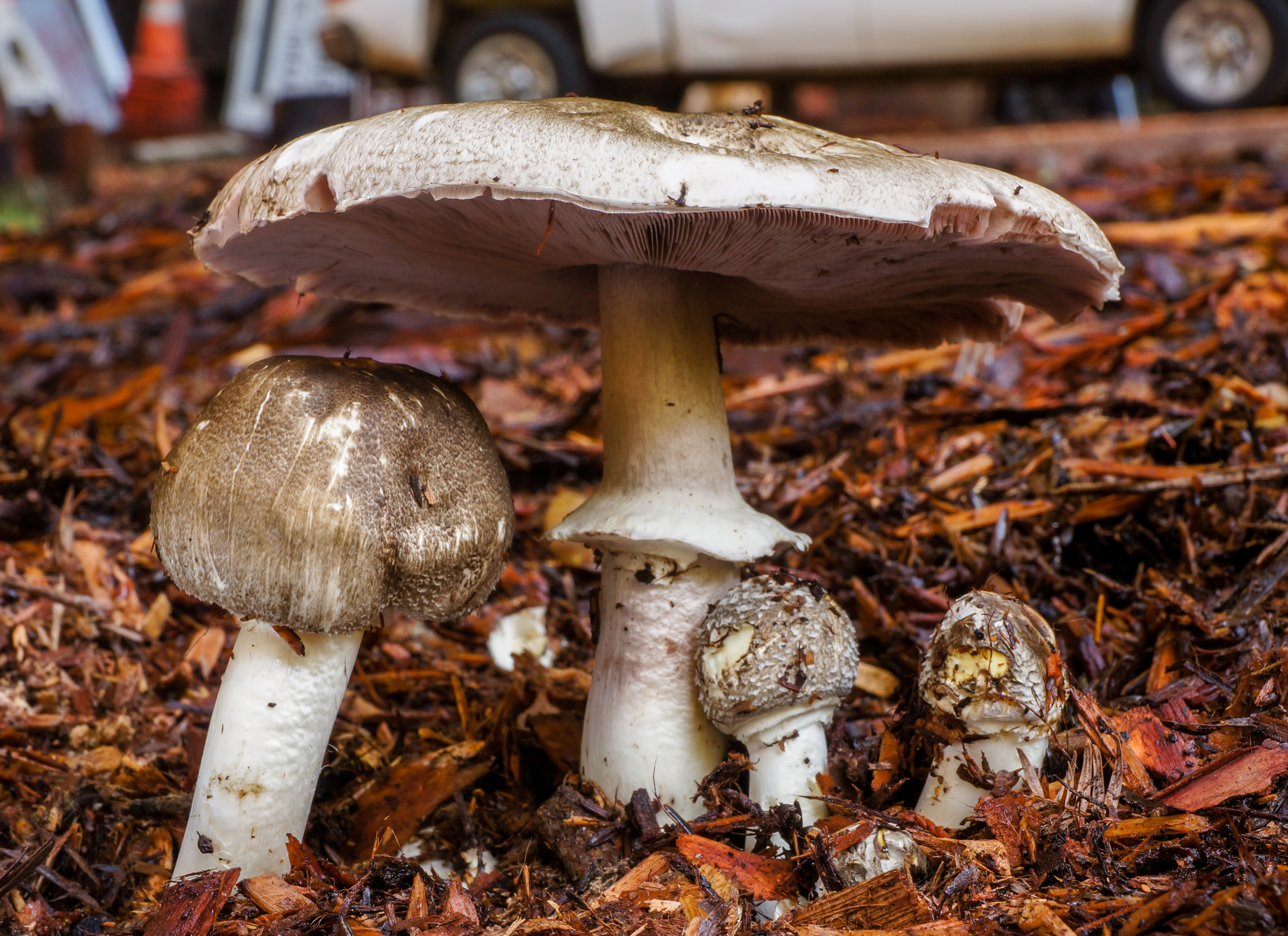
Agaricus buckmacadooi Kerrigan 2016

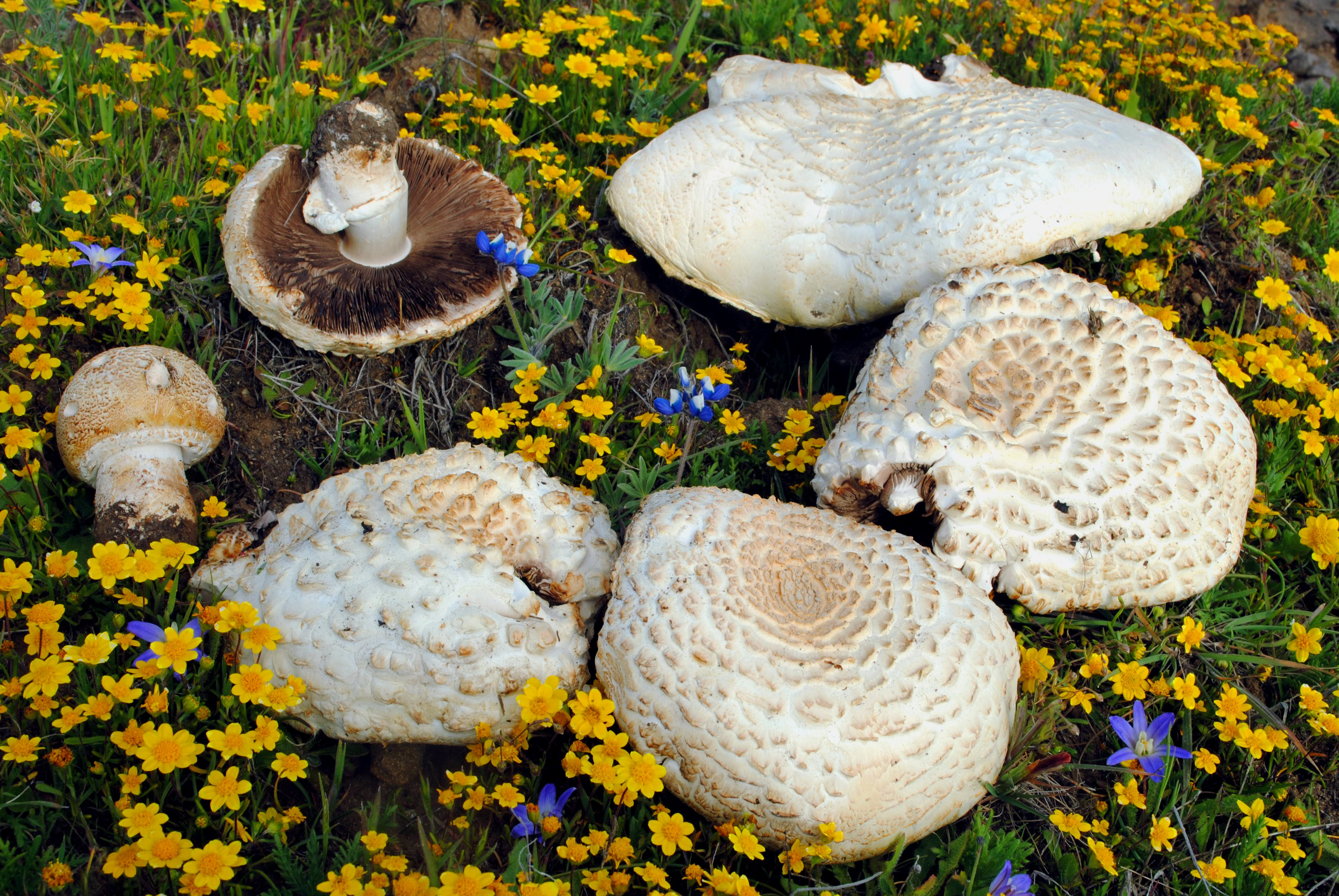
Agaricus crocodilinus Murrill 1912

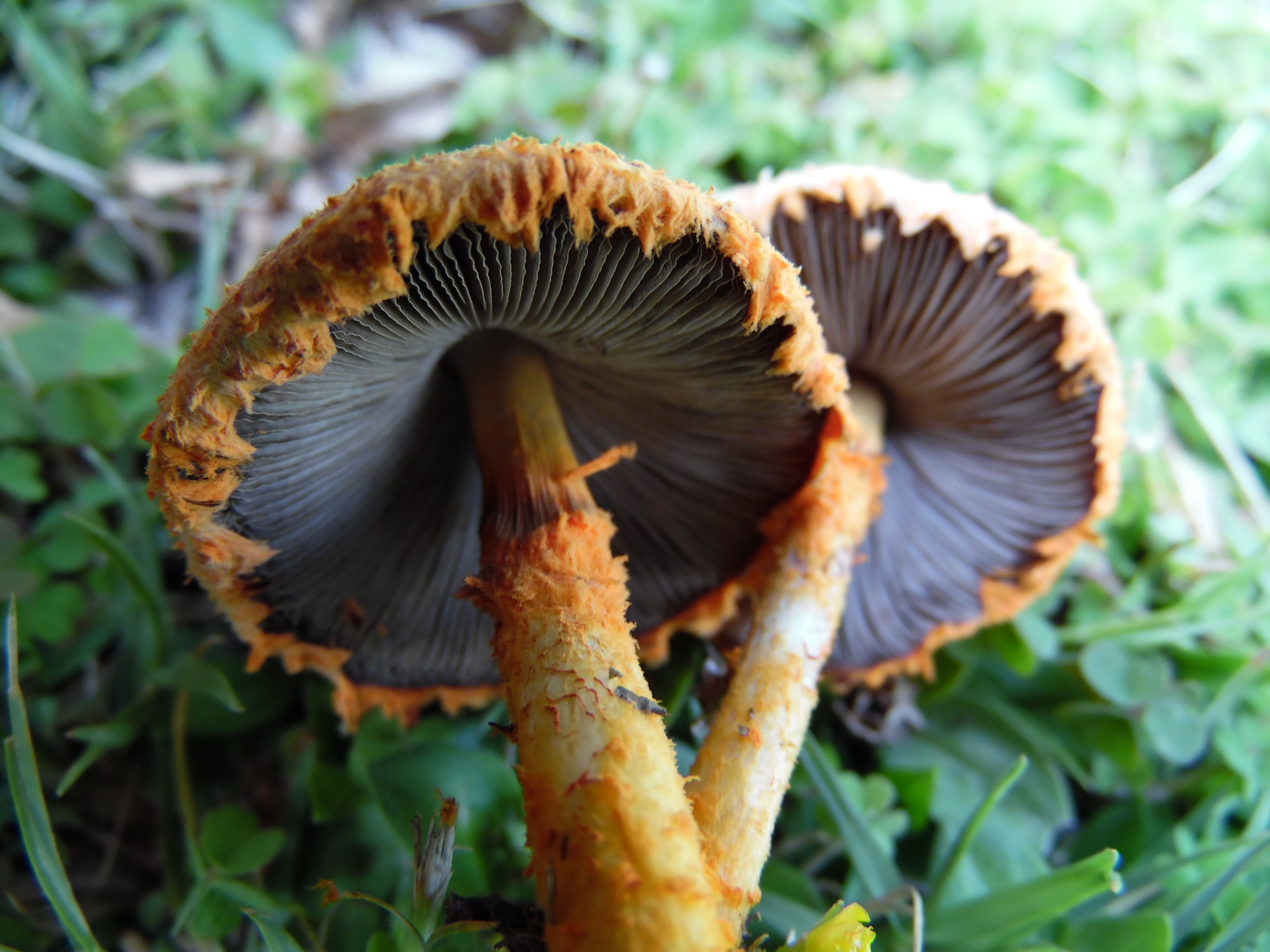
Agaricus crocopeplus Berk. & Broome 1871

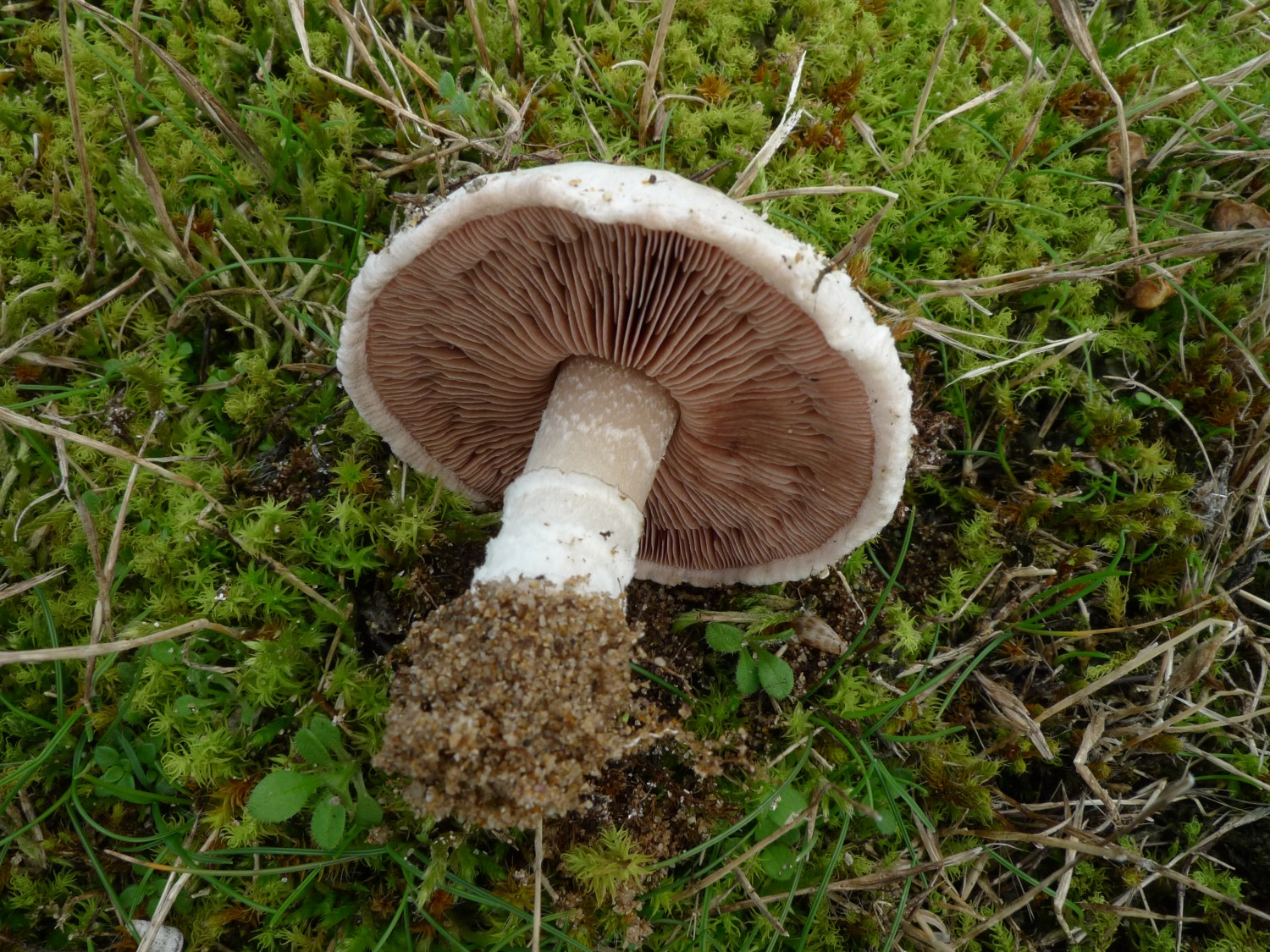
Agaricus devoniensis P.D.Orton 1960

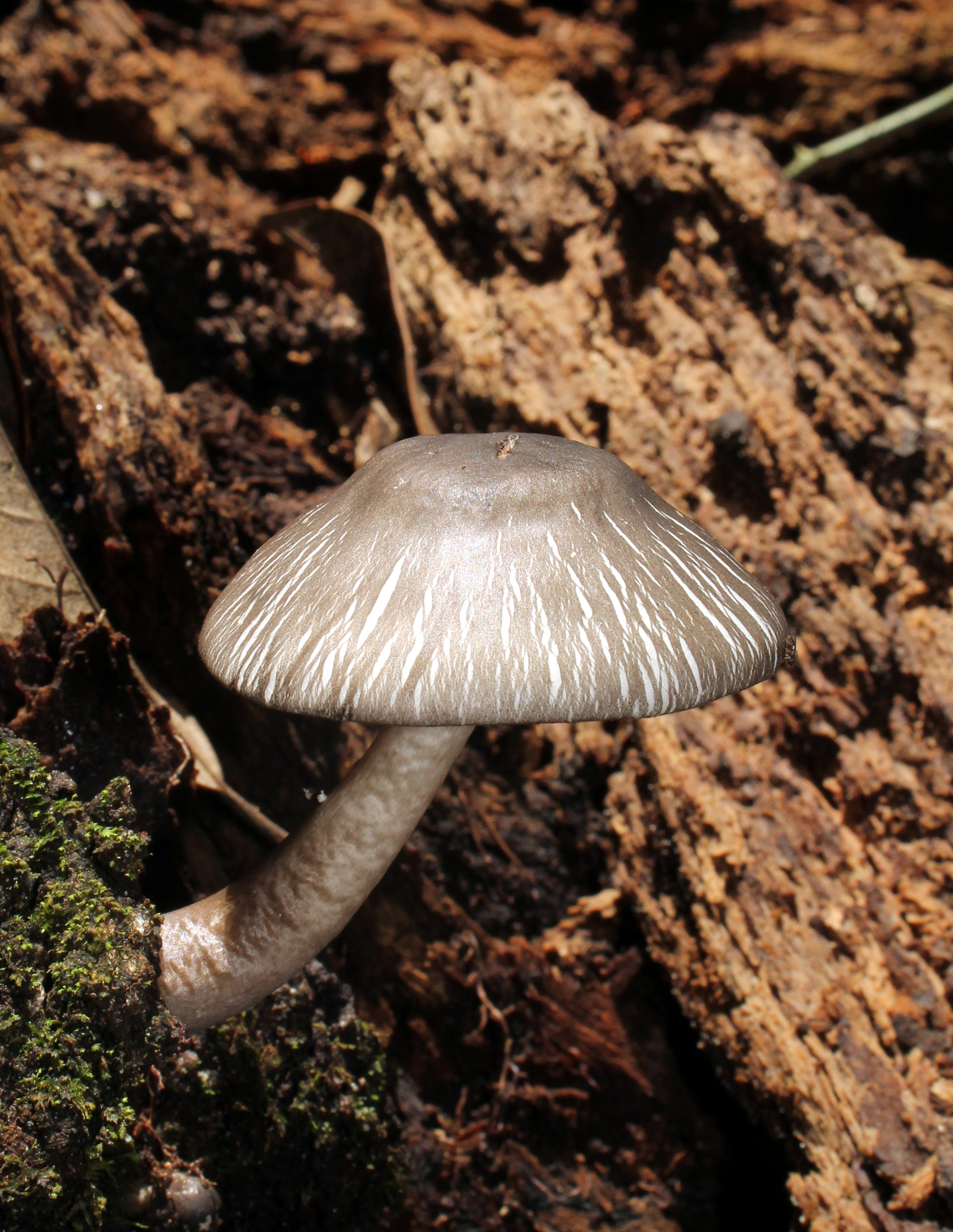
Agaricus endoxanthus Berk. & Broome 1871

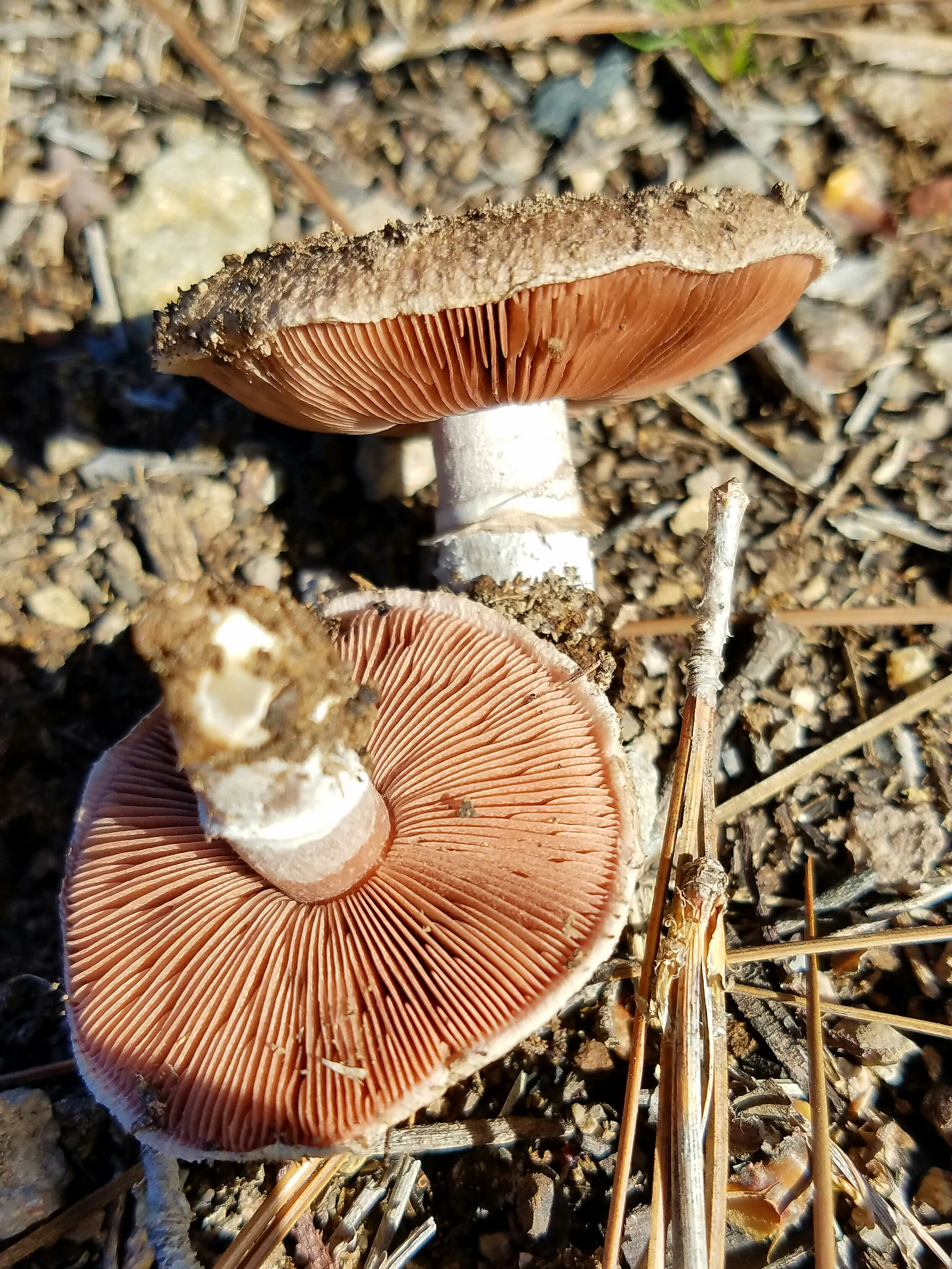
Agaricus incultorum Kerrigan 2016

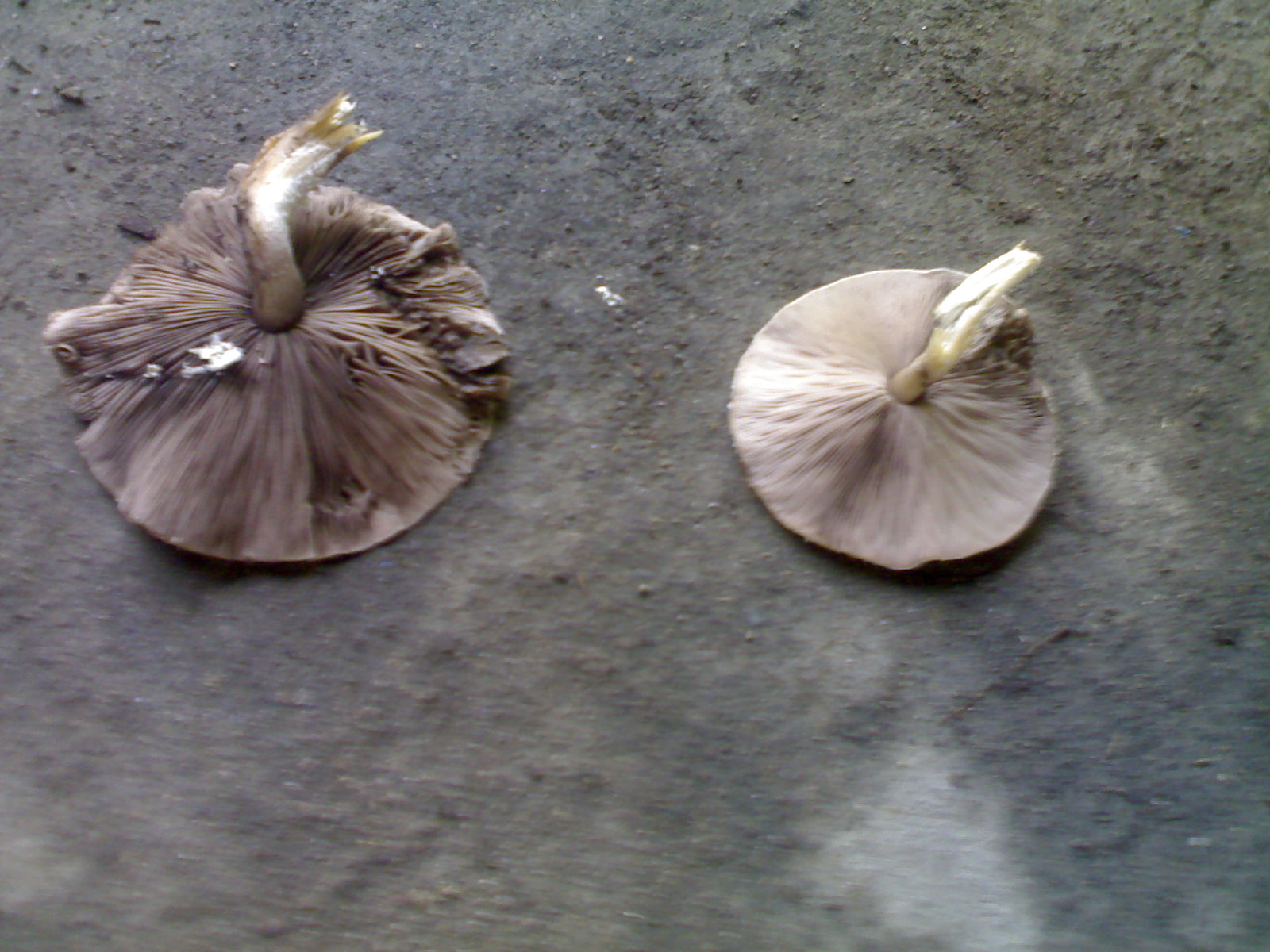
Agaricus merrilli Copel. 1905

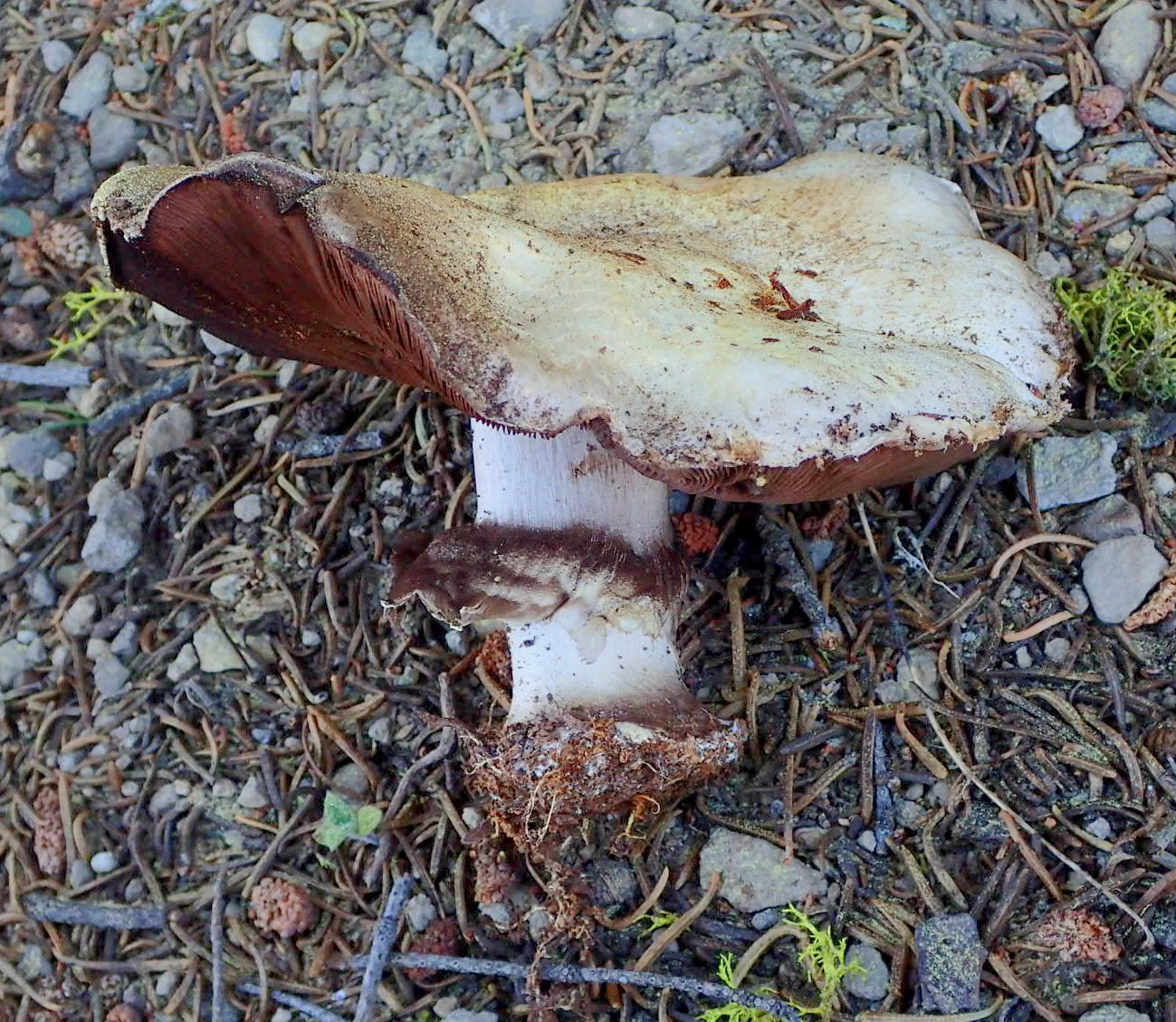
Agaricus moronii Kerrigan 2016

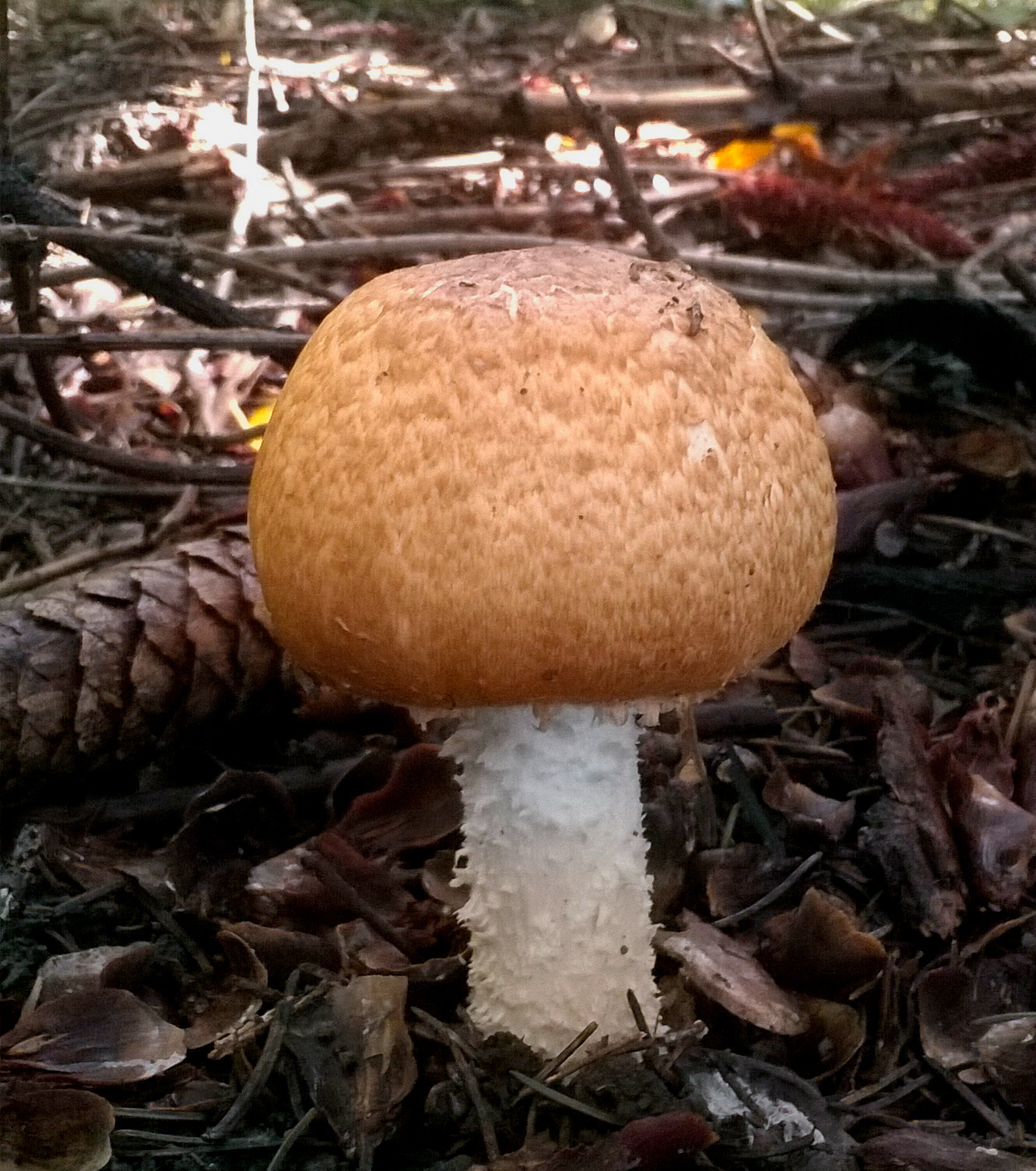
Agaricus nanaugustus Kerrigan 2016

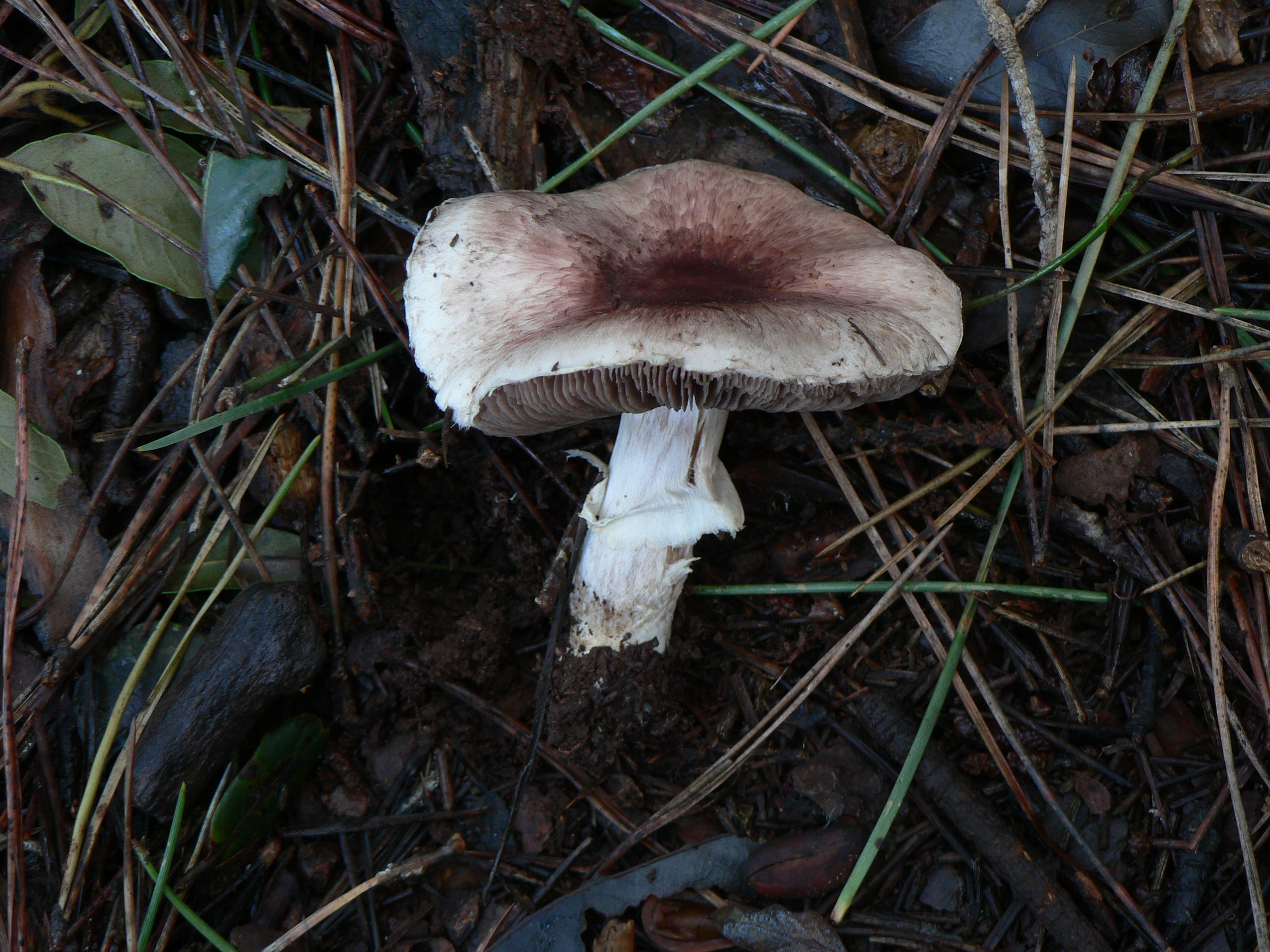
Agaricus porphyrizon P.D.Orton 1960

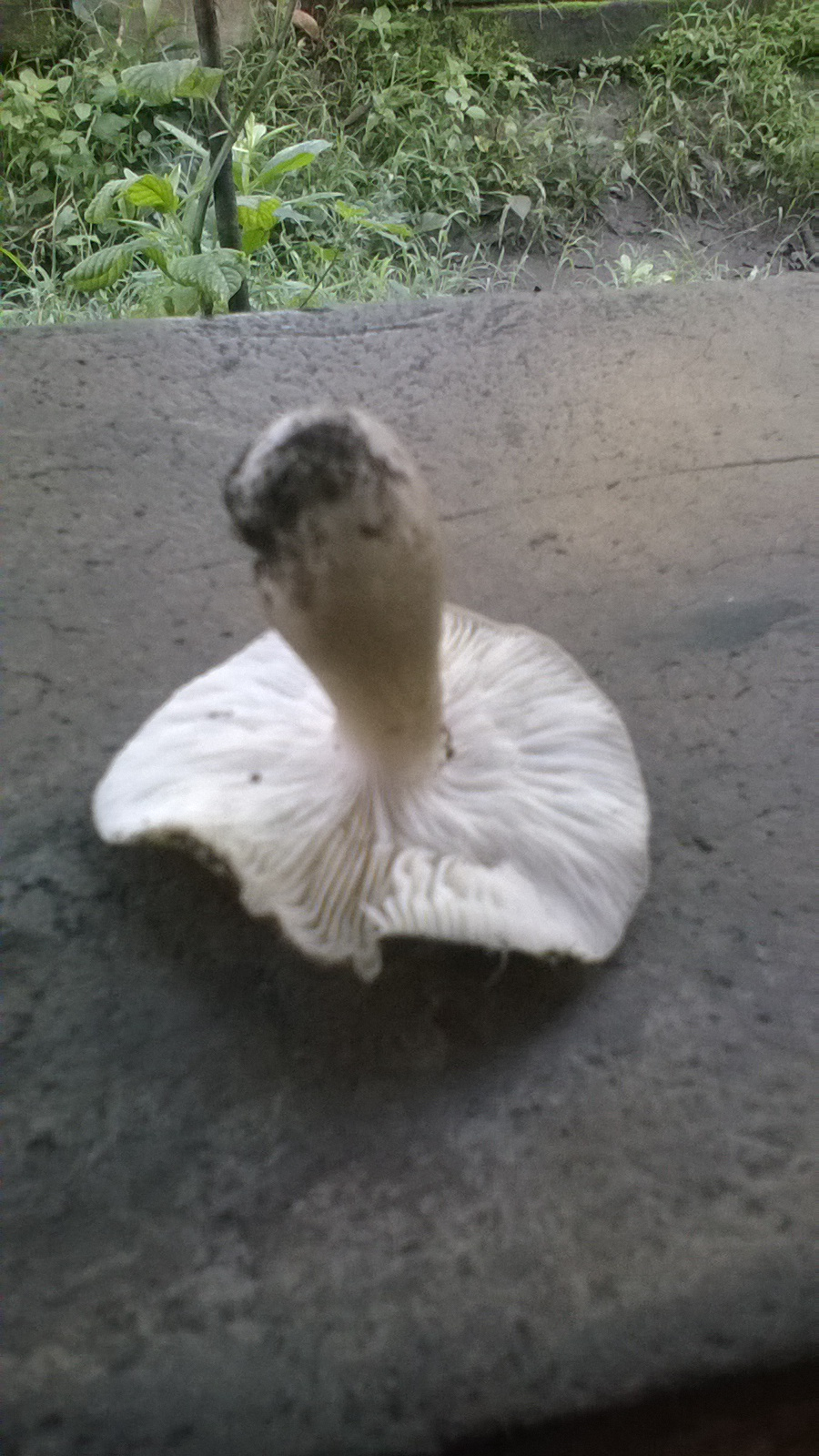
Agaricus rhoadsii Murrill 1939

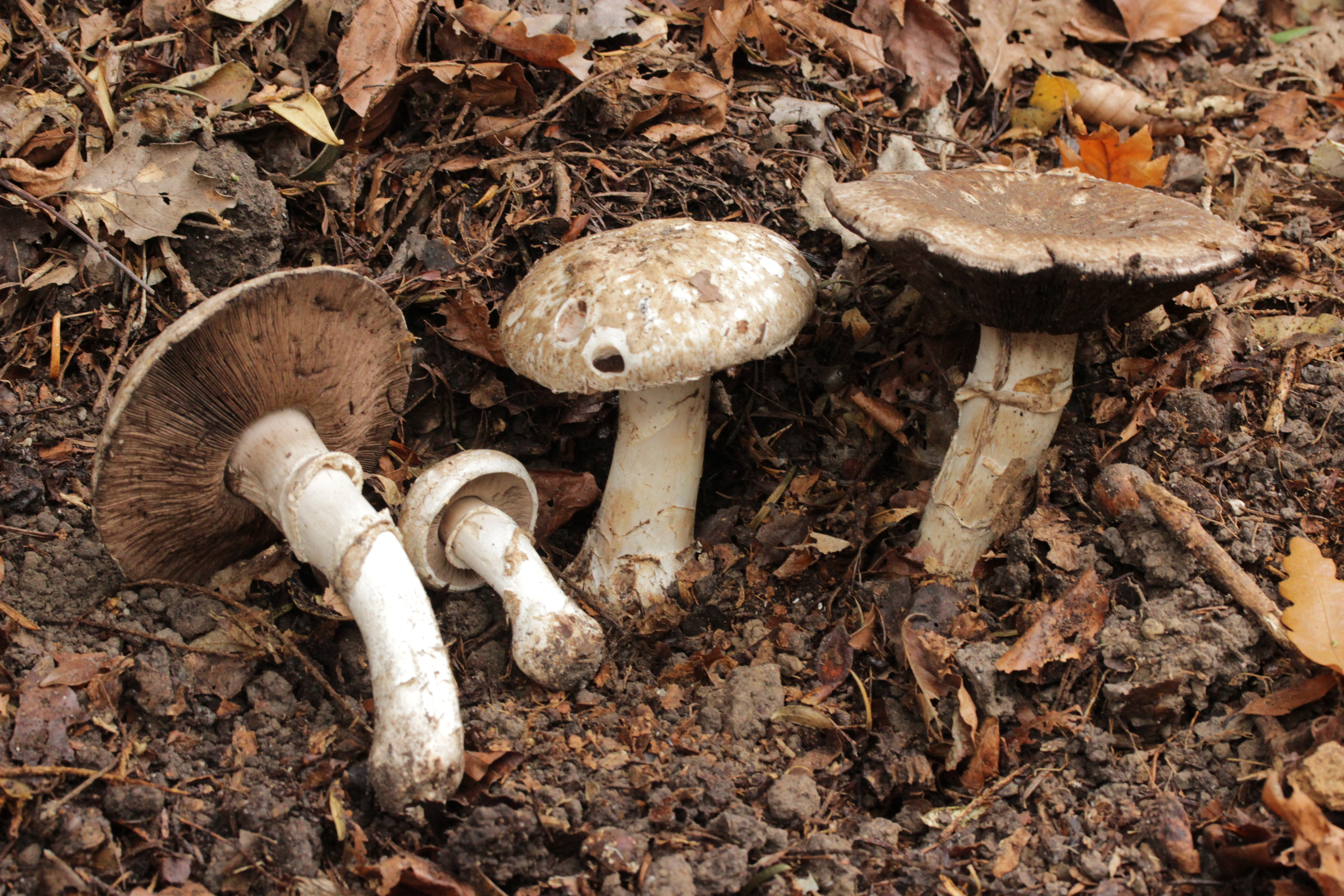
Agaricus subperonatus (J.E.Lange 1926) Singer 1949

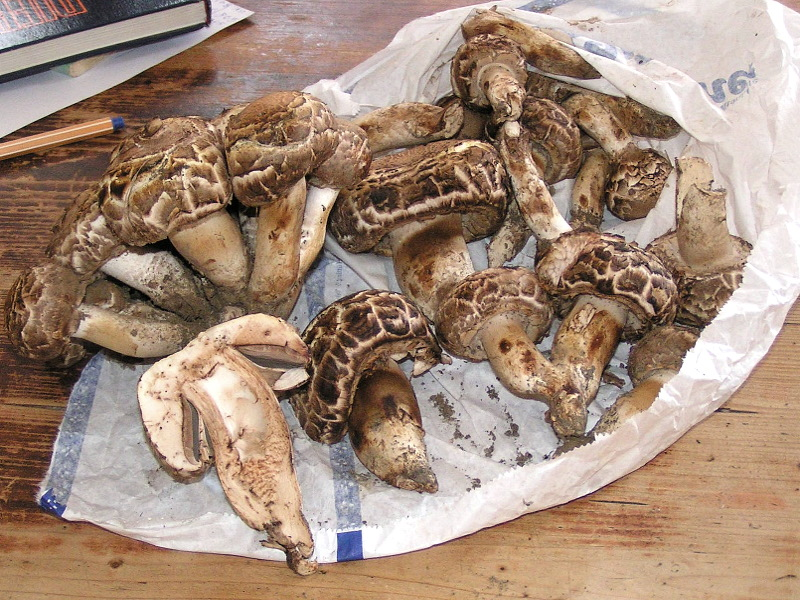
Agaricus vaporarius (Pers. 1801) J.Otto 1816

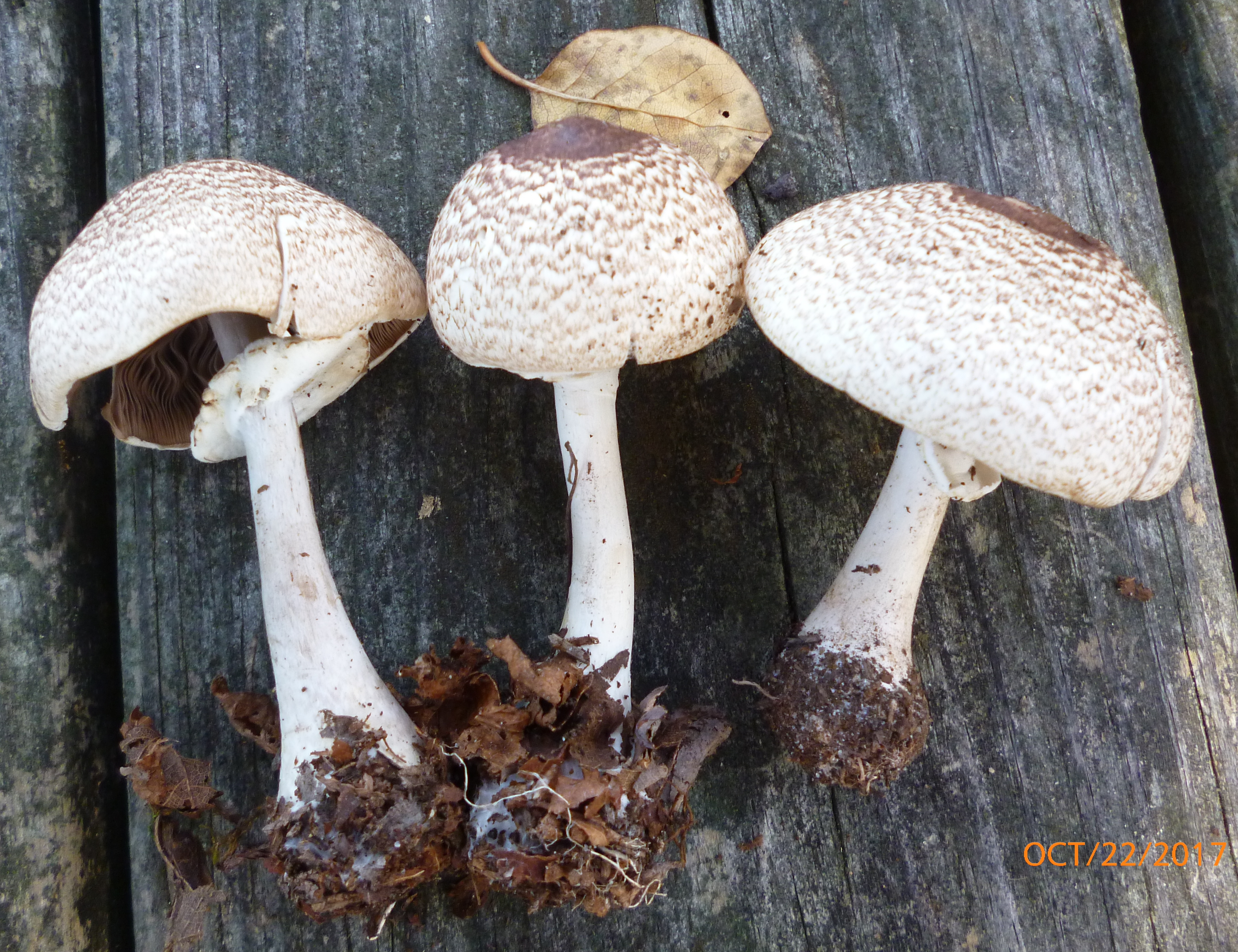
Agaricus vinosobrunneofumidus Kerrigan 2016
