= Agaricus nebularum =

Scientific classification
- Domain: Eukaryota
- Kingdom: Fungi
- Division: Basidiomycota
- Class: Agaricomycetes
- Order: Agaricales
- Family: Agaricaceae
- Genus: Agaricus
- Species: A. nebularum

Binomial name
- Agaricus nebularum Singer (1969)

Species of fungus

Agaricus nebularum is a species of fungus in the genus Agaricus. Found in Chile, it was described as new to science in 1969 by mycologist Rolf Singer.

== See also ==
- List of Agaricus species
