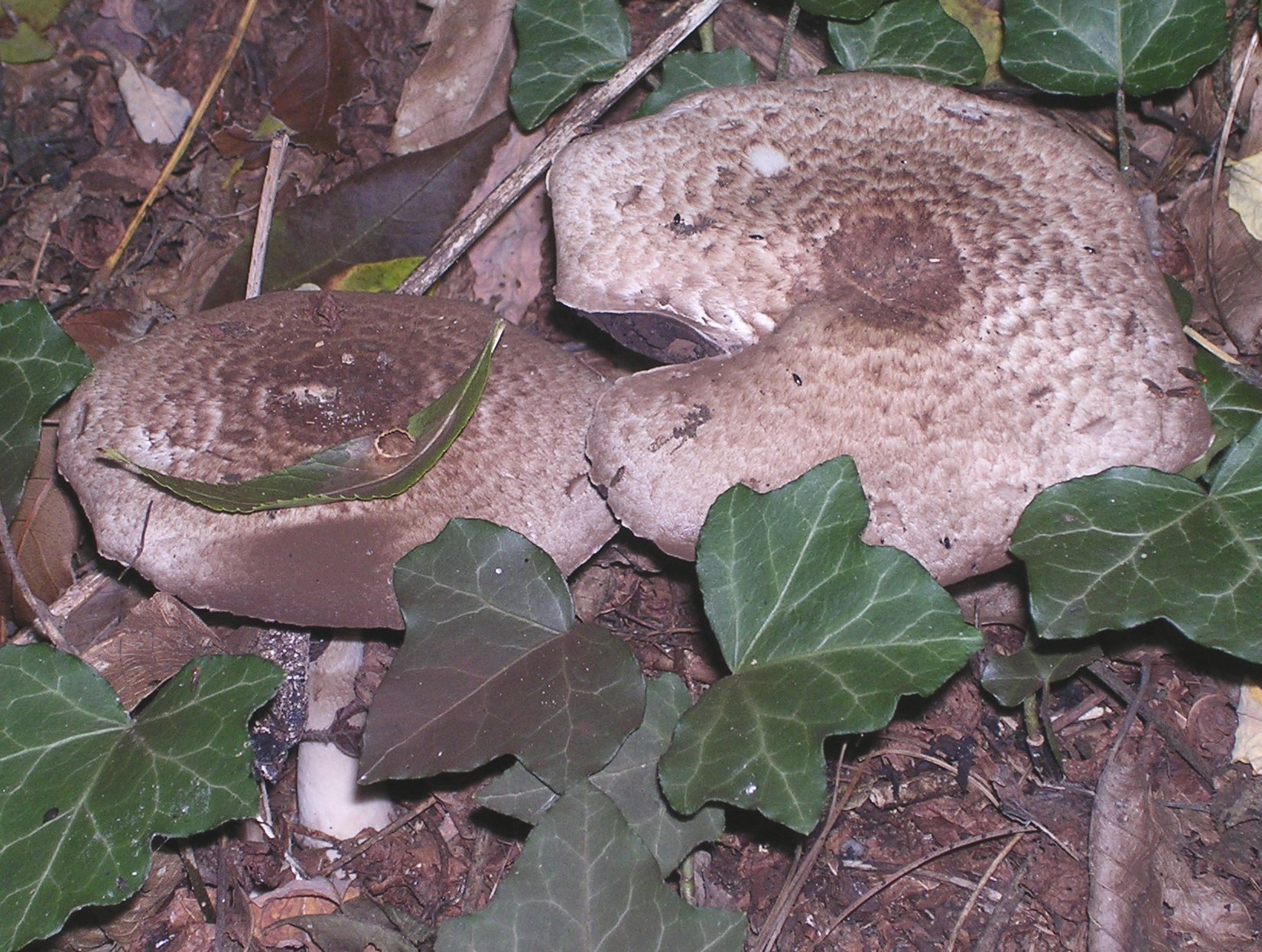

Scientific classification
- Kingdom: Fungi
- Division: Basidiomycota
- Class: Agaricomycetes
- Order: Agaricales
- Family: Agaricaceae
- Genus: Agaricus
- Species: A. perobscurus

Binomial name
- Agaricus perobscurus Kerrigan (1985)

= Agaricus perobscurus =

Species of fungus

Agaricus perobscurus
- Mycological characteristics
- Gills on hymenium
- Cap is flat
- Hymenium is free
- Stipe has a ring
- Spore print is brown
- Ecology is saprotrophic
- Edibility is choice

Agaricus perobscurus, commonly known as the princess, is a species of choice edible basidiomycete fungus. It is similar to the choice A. augustus (the prince) and the toxic A. praeclaresquamosus.

== Description ==
The cap is 8–12 cm (3 1/4–4 3/4 in) broad, and becomes deeply convex to flattened. The surface is dry, with a uniformly dark-brown disc. The disc can be either flattened or depressed, and is appressed fibrillose-squamulose. Towards the margin, it begins to diffuse. It is brown over a pallid ground color. Meanwhile, the margin is incurved in youth, then decurved, and eventually turns straight or slightly raised. The cap cuticle bruises slowly tawny-brown, and yellows in KOH. The flesh is white, soft, and can be up to 1.5 cm (1/2 in) thick. When injured, it can change to a cream color to tawny. The odor is that of anise, with a mild taste.

The gills are free, close, and relatively broad. When young, they have a whitish color, though they turn blackish-brownat maturity. The gills can be either five or six-seried.

The stipe can be 6–12 cm (2 1/4–4 3/4 in) long, and 1.5–2 cm (1/2–3/4 in) thick. Often tapered to a bulbous base, it can be stuffed to hollow at maturity. The surface of apex is white, and silky-striate. The lower portion is white, with the fibrils forming scattered appressed squamules. In contrast, the base of the stipe discolors slowly a dull orange-brown where handled. The flesh changes sporadically from a cream-yellow to tawny-brown when injured or cut. The partial veil is white, membranous, and has small brown floccose scales concentrated near the margin. The annulus is thin and pendulous on the stipe.

The spores are 6.5–8.0 μm by 4.5–5.0 μm, smooth, thick-walled, and ellipsoid. They are inequilateral in profile, without a conspicuous hilar appendage. Their germ pore is not evident, and the spore print is a blackish-brown color.

=== Similar species ===
The related A. augustus (the prince) is widely distributed in North America; by contrast, A. perobscurus has a darker-brown cap, a patchy fibrillose stipe surface at youth, and a different fruiting season. The toxic A. praeclaresquamosus can be differentiated by its dark-grey cap, a phenolic (rather than aniselike) odor, and a stipe base which yellows immediately when injured.

== Habitat and distribution ==
Agaricus perobscurus is often solitary or in small groups under conifers and hardwoods. Primarily found in urban parks with trees like Monterey cypress, Monterey pine, and Eucalyptus, they fruit on the West Coast of North America from mid to late winter. It is populous in the San Francisco Bay Area.

== Uses ==
The species is edible and choice.

== See also ==
- List of Agaricus species
