= Agaricus santacatalinensis =

Scientific classification
- Domain: Eukaryota
- Kingdom: Fungi
- Division: Basidiomycota
- Class: Agaricomycetes
- Order: Agaricales
- Family: Agaricaceae
- Genus: Agaricus
- Species: A. santacatalinensis

Binomial name
- Agaricus santacatalinensis Albertó (1998)

Species of fungus

Agaricus santacatalinensis is a species of agaric fungus. Described as new to science in 1998 by Edgardo Albertó, it is found in deciduous forests of Brazil, where it grows under privets (Ligustrum) and elm (Ulmus). The fruit bodies feature caps that are 7–12 cm (2.8–4.7 in) in diameter with felt-like surfaces. Somewhat unusually, the gills mature centrifugally (from the cap center outward to the edge). Initially, they are ochre yellow before turning dark brown after the spores mature. The stipe measures 8.5–12 cm (3.3–4.7 in) long by 1.5–2 cm (0.6–0.8 in) thick. It is white from the cap down to the ring, below which it becomes yellowish with orange tints. The base of the stipe has short yellowish rhizomorphs. The ring is membranous, measuring 1–2 mm thick. The edibility of the mushroom is unknown.

The spores are ellipsoid, and measure 5–5.5 by 3.5–5 μm. Agaricus santacatalinensis was initially classified in the subgenus Lanagaricus of the genus Agaricus.

== See also ==
- List of Agaricus species
