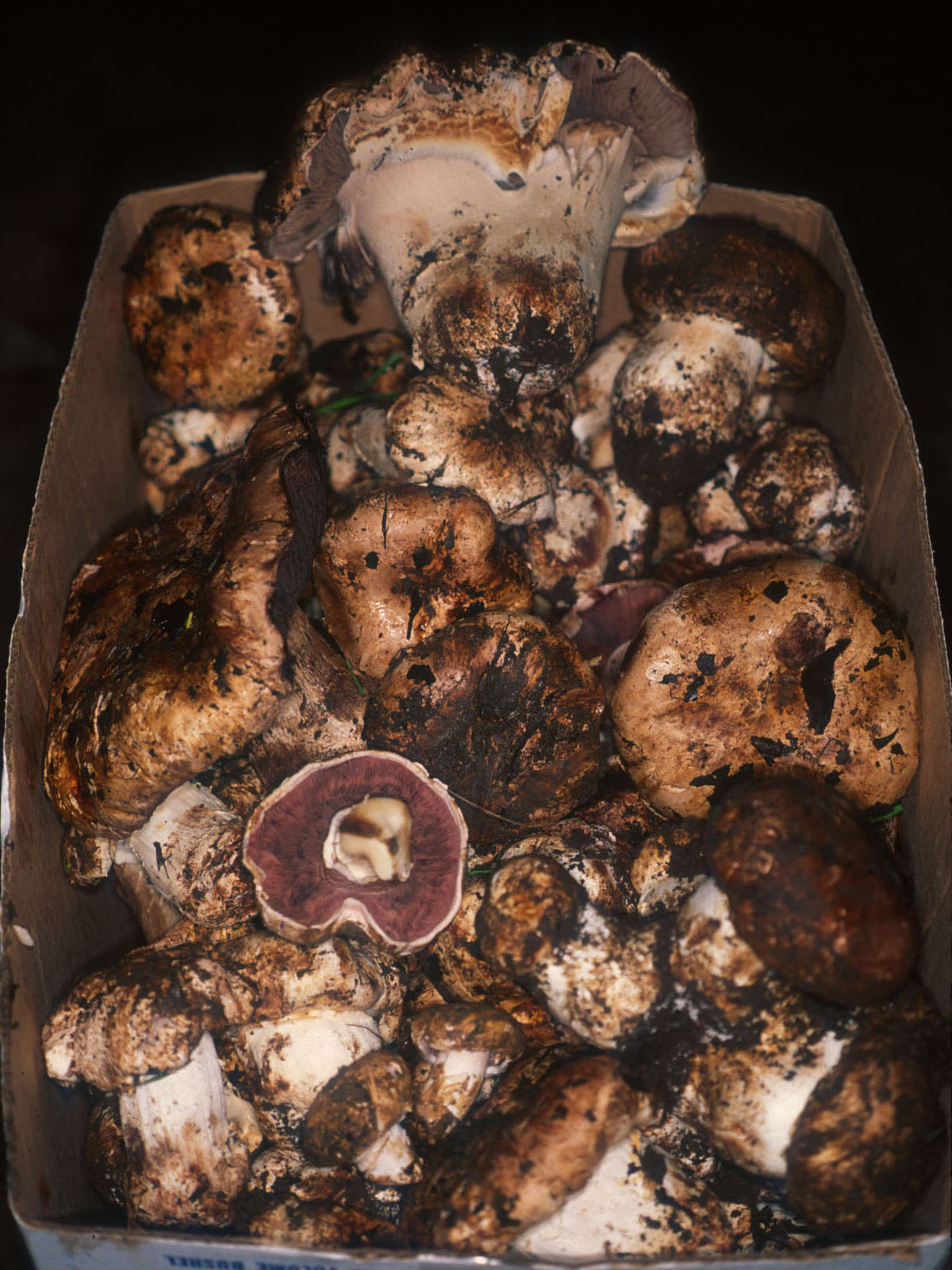
- A box of Agaricus lilaceps

Scientific classification
- Kingdom: Fungi
- Division: Basidiomycota
- Class: Agaricomycetes
- Order: Agaricales
- Family: Agaricaceae
- Genus: Agaricus
- Species: A. lilaceps

Binomial name
- Agaricus lilaceps Zeller (1938)

= Agaricus lilaceps =

Species of mushroom

Agaricus lilaceps
- Mycological characteristics
- Gills on hymenium
- Cap is flat or depressed
- Hymenium is free
- Stipe is bare
- Spore print is blackish-brown
- Ecology is saprotrophic
- Edibility is choice

Agaricus lilaceps, also known as the cypress agaricus or the giant cypress agaricus, is a species of fungus. Aside from size, the mushroom is characterized by its robust stature. It is a prized edible.

== Description ==
The cap is 7–25 centimetres (3–10 in) broad. It is convex, expanding to nearly plane. As it ages, the disc sometimes depresses. The margin, however, is incurved, although it decurves at maturity. The surface of the cap is at first pallid to cream-buff, especially when developing below ground, but soon becomes appressed and fibrillose-squamose. In addition, it varies from brown, hazel-brown, dull chestnut-brown, and occasionally lilac-brown, although it darkens as it ages. At times, the surface develops orange-brown, rufescent areas. The context is thick, very firm, white, and slowly turns vinaceous when cut or bruised. The odor is that of a typical mushroom, although it tastes mild.

The gills are free, close, moderately broad, and dingy-pink when young. However, when bruised, it turns reddish-brown slowly, and dark chocolate-brown at maturity.

The stipe (stem) is 5–22 cm (2–8 1/2 in) long, 3–6 cm (1 1/4–2 1/4 in) thick, and equal to clavate. The core of the stem is stuffed, while the surface is dry and white with scattered fibrils at the apex. However, the base is a discoloring dingy brownish-red to ochraceous. Also, the stipe can be smooth to patchy fibrillose below. There is a white partial veil that is membranous, thick, and elastic. The upper surface is wrinkled, while the lower surface is more or less smooth, occasionally cracking and forming patches. Also, the lower surface sometimes yellows in age or when bruised, forming a superior, pendulous annulus at maturity. The stipe gradually becomes blackish from adhering spores.

The spores are 5–6.5 by 4–5 μm, elliptical, and smooth. The spore print is dark-brown.

=== Identification ===
A. lilaceps can be distinguished from its relatives by its size, robust stature, reddening flesh, and the typical club shape of the stem.

== Habitat and distribution ==
The mushrooms can be found scattered or clustered under Cupressus macrocarpa (Monterey cypress). They fruit from mid- to late winter. They are found exclusively in the central area of California, but can be found as far west as the Monterey Bay area. They can also be found on Stanford University under the eucalyptus. absolute positive identification of A. lillceps has been made as far North as Eureka,Ca. By my testimony on iNaturalist in both 2024 and 2025 under the same Monterey Cypress at Thanksgiving.

== Uses ==
It is among the largest and most choice edible Agaricus species in California. It may require thorough cooking to tenderize.

== See also ==
- List of Agaricus species
