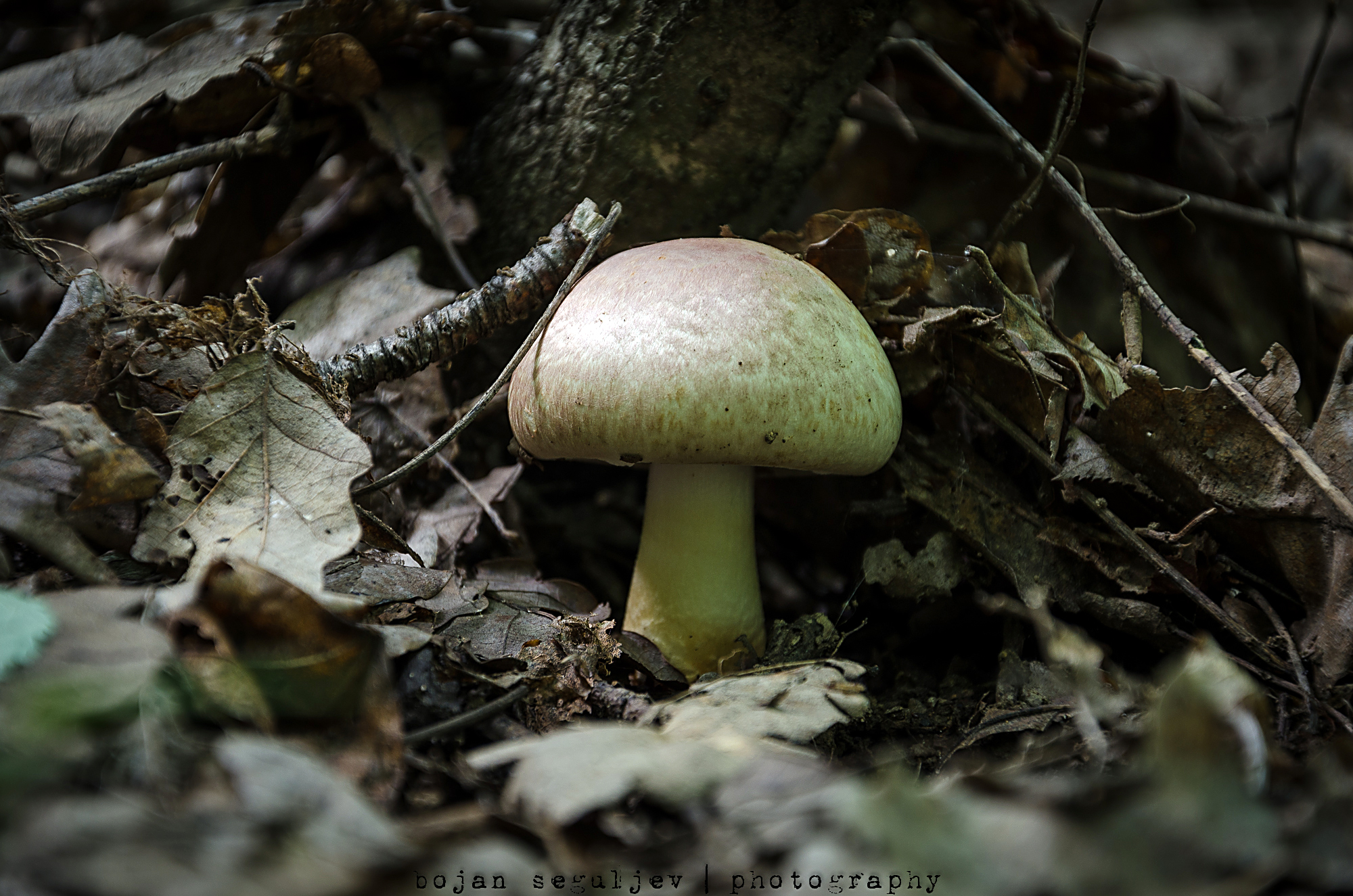

Scientific classification
- Kingdom: Fungi
- Division: Basidiomycota
- Class: Agaricomycetes
- Order: Agaricales
- Family: Agaricaceae
- Genus: Agaricus
- Species: A. porphyrizon

Binomial name
- Agaricus porphyrizon P.D. Orton, 1960

= Agaricus porphyrizon =

Species of Fungi

Agaricus porphyrizon, the lilac mushroom, is a rare species of fungi in the genus Agaricus.

== Description ==
Agaricus porphyrizon has a convex cap 4–10 cm wide. The gills are free from the stem, crowded. The stem is 2.5–7 cm long and has a flimsy ring that often falls off. The flesh is white but bruises yellow.

== Habitat ==
Agaricus porphyrizon is found in mixed and deciduous woodland, as well as grassy areas.

== Edibility ==
The edibility of Agaricus porphyrizon is unknown.
