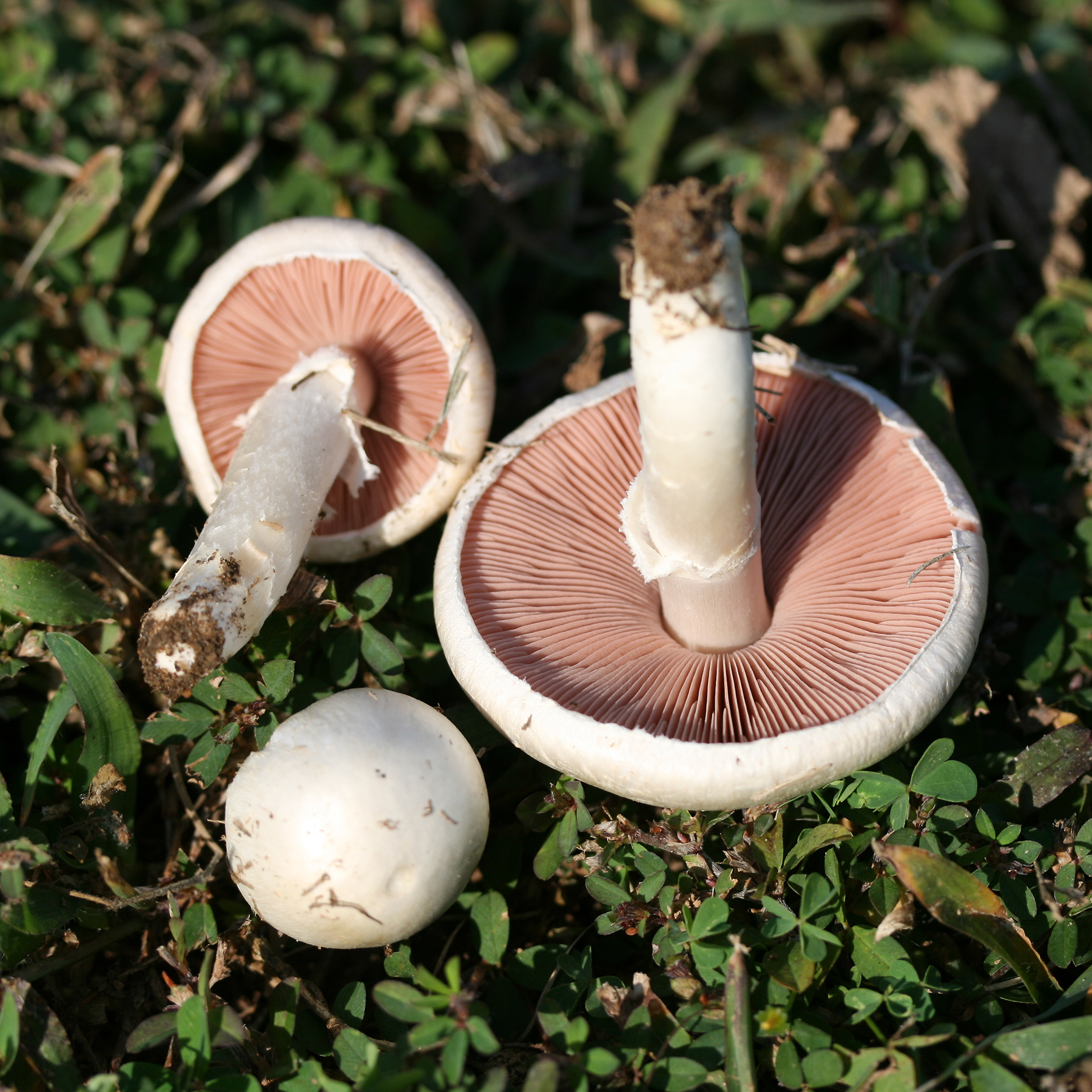

Scientific classification
- Kingdom: Fungi
- Division: Basidiomycota
- Class: Agaricomycetes
- Order: Agaricales
- Family: Agaricaceae
- Genus: Agaricus
- Species: A. andrewii

Binomial name
- Agaricus andrewii A.E Freeman

= Agaricus andrewii =

Species of fungi

Agaricus andrewii
- Mycological characteristics
- Gills on hymenium
- Cap is convex
- Hymenium is free
- Stipe has a ring
- Spore print is blackish-brown
- Ecology is saprotrophic
- Edibility is choice

Agaricus andrewii, the false meadow mushroom, is a species of fungi in the Agaricus genus.

== Description ==
Agaricus andrewii has a dry and whitish-yellowish convex cap 4–11 cm (1.6–4.3 in) wide. The gills are pinkish and free from the stem with a whitish partial veil. The stem is 4–7 cm (1.6–2.8 in) long, 1.5–2.5 cm (0.59–0.98 in) thick with a ring. It has white flesh.

== Ecology ==
Agaricus andrewii is a saprotrophic mushroom found in grass in autumn.

== Lookalikes ==
Agaricus andrewii is almost indistinguishable from Agaricus campestris, but A. campestris has an whiter and smoother cap.

== Edibility ==
Like Agaricus campestris, it is a choice edible mushroom.

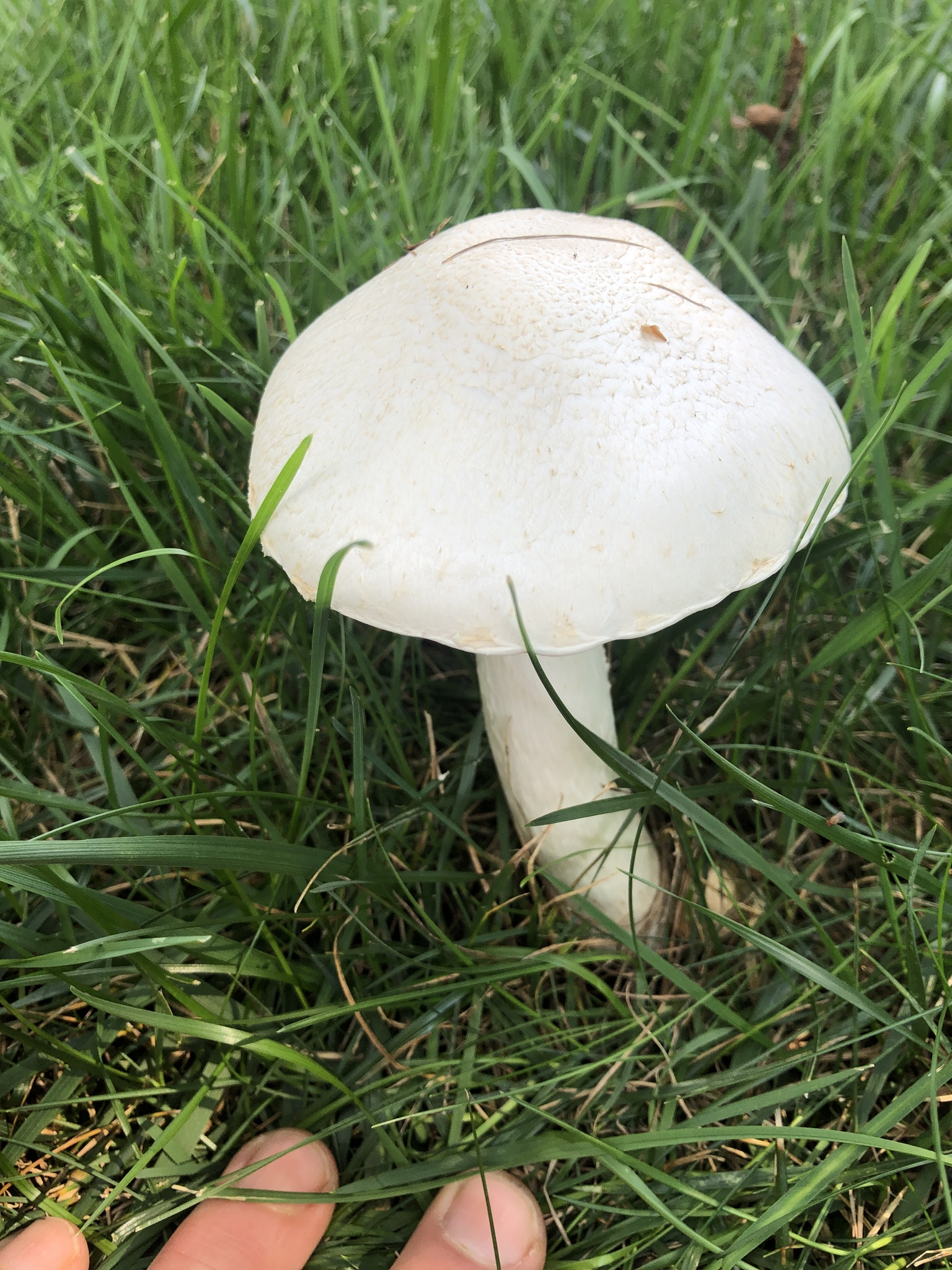
Growing in the grass

== Distribution ==
Agaricus andrewii can be found all over North America.
