= Agaricus agrocyboides =

Scientific classification
- Kingdom: Fungi
- Division: Basidiomycota
- Class: Agaricomycetes
- Order: Agaricales
- Family: Nidulariaceae
- Genus: Agaricus
- Species: A. agrocyboides

Binomial name
- Agaricus agrocyboides Heinem. & Gooss.-Font. (1956)

Species of mushroom-forming fungus

Agaricus agrocyboides is a species of mushroom-forming fungus in the family Agaricaceae. It is a medium-sized, ochraceous-brown mushroom with a bell-shaped cap that expands with age and a slender, hollow stipe that stains ochre when handled. The species was described in 1956 from an old coffee plantation in what is now South Kivu, Democratic Republic of the Congo.

== Taxonomy ==
Agaricus agrocyboides was formally described as a new species in 1956 by Paul Heinemann and Julie-Marie-Henriette Goossens-Fontana, based on collections made by Goossens-Fontana at Panzi Kivu in the Belgian Congo. Heinemann placed it in Agaricus section Arvenses, subsection Silvicolae. He treated it as a close relative of other ochraceous members of that group, but separated it by its small spores, very large cheilocystidia, and its overall ochraceous-brown colouring.

A 2024 comparison with the newly described Chinese species Agaricus sinoagrocyboides characterized A. agrocyboides as differing in its brown pileus, slightly pink at the margin and bearing scales of the same colour, a longer stipe with small ochre scales below the ring, narrower basidiospores, smaller basidia, and abundant pear-shaped cheilocystidia; the authors also treated it as a tropical member of Agaricus section Arvenses.

== Description ==
The fruiting body has a cap 4–6 cm wide that is at first broadly bell-shaped, later expanding and developing a low central bump (an umbo) with a slight depression at the top. Its surface is pale ochraceous-brown, a little pinker toward the margin and more ochraceous at the centre, and is covered with fine fibrils and small, rather indistinct scales of the same colour. The stipe is slender, 6–8 cm long and 5–7 mm thick, hollow, and gradually widens toward the base, which reaches about 12 mm across. Above the ring it is white and fibrillose; below the ring it is dotted with small ochraceous scales and stains ochre when handled. The ring is white, broad, membranous, and fragile, with a torn edge. The gills are crowded, free from the stipe, and up to about 5 mm broad; they become progressively darker with age, and the spore print is brown. The flesh is firm and white, but turns brownish when cut, with a more reddish-brown tint in the stipe.

Microscopically, the spores are comparatively small, elongated to ellipsoid, and measure 5.2–6.6 by 3.2–3.8 μm. They lack a germ pore. The gill edges bear abundant, broadly pear-shaped cheilocystidia measuring 30–40 by 11–22 μm. The cap surface is made up of long cylindrical hyphae with abundant yellow and orange-brown deposits between them. On dried material, the Schaeffer reaction was recorded as a strong fire-red colour.

== Habitat and distribution ==
This species is known only from Panzi in present-day South Kivu, Democratic Republic of the Congo, then part of the Belgian Congo. The type was collected in December 1954, and a second collection was made there in January 1955. It was found growing singly or in small groups of two or three on soil in an old Coffea arabica plantation, so the species appears, at least from the early available records, to be associated with cultivated ground rather than forest habitat.
