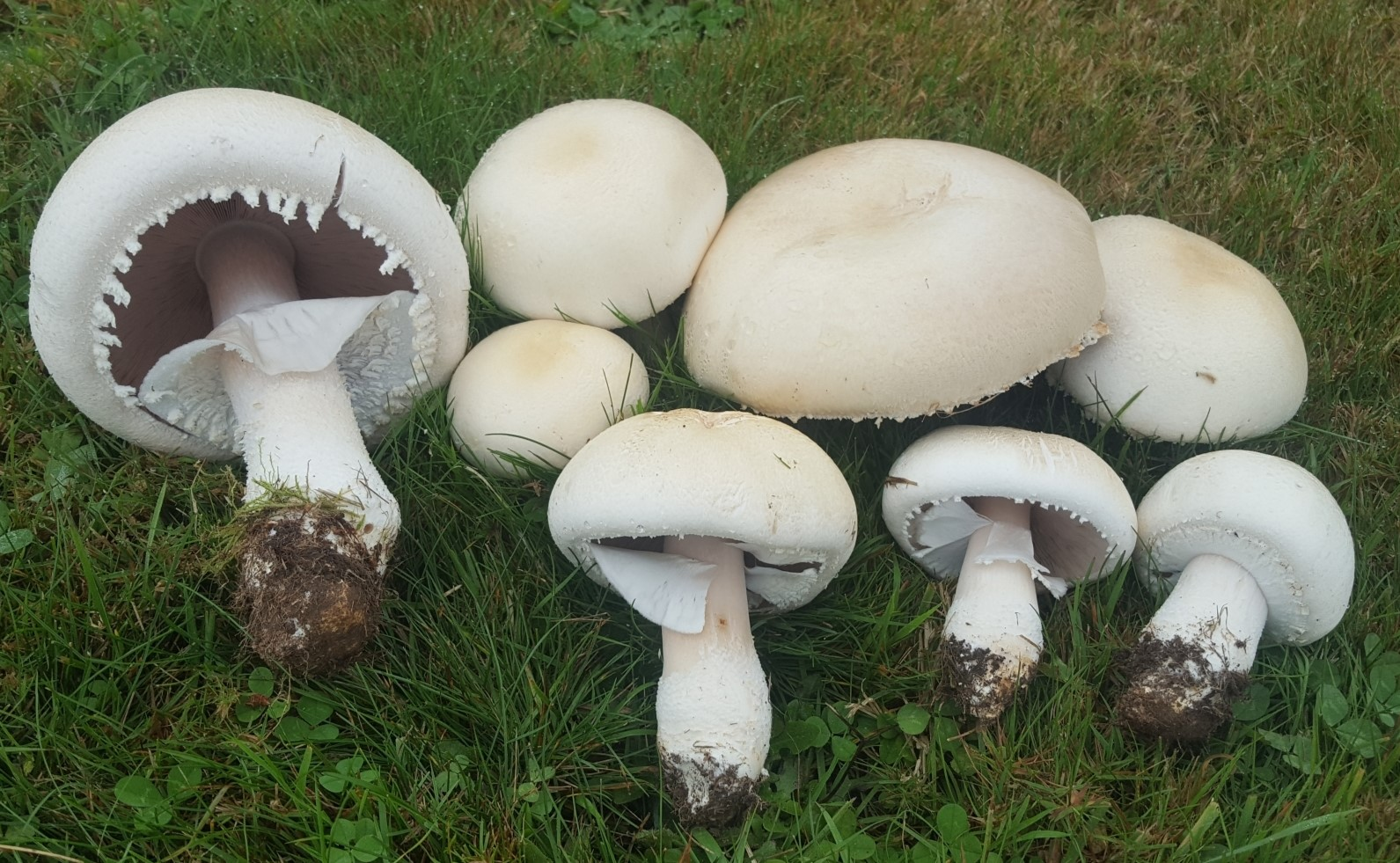

Scientific classification
- Kingdom: Fungi
- Division: Basidiomycota
- Class: Agaricomycetes
- Order: Agaricales
- Family: Agaricaceae
- Genus: Agaricus
- Species: A. crocodilinus

Binomial name
- Agaricus crocodilinus Murrill

Synonyms
- Agaricus macrosporus; Agaricus urinescens

= Agaricus crocodilinus =

Agaricus crocodilinus
- Mycological characteristics
- Gills on hymenium
- Cap is convex
- Hymenium is free
- Stipe has a ring
- Spore print is brown
- Edibility is edible

Agaricus crocodilinus, commonly known as the crocodile agaricus or macro mushroom, is a species of mushroom in the family Agaricaceae.

== Taxonomy ==
Agaricus crocodilinus was first described by William Murrill in 1912. The specific epithet is in reference to its warty surface, reminiscent of a crocodile's skin.

== Description ==
The cap starts out round, before becoming broadly convex. It is 5–12 centimetres (2–4 1/2 in) across when young, but can reach 20–40 cm (8–15 1/2 in). The stipe is 6–20 cm (2 1/4–7 3/4 in) long and 2–4 cm (3/4–1 1/2 in) wide, with a ring. The gills are free, starting out tannish and later becoming reddish to blackish brown.

=== Similar species ===
It can sometimes be confused with Agaricus arvensis and the poisonous A. xanthodermus.

== Habitat and ecology ==
Agaricus crocodilinus often grows in prairies and pastures with a lot of grass. It is saprophytic.

== Uses ==
Agaricus crocodilinus is considered edible and highly regarded, but often contains maggots (even when young) and can be confused with at least one poisonous species. It has also been known to accumulate the toxic chemical cadmium, even in non-polluted areas.
