= Agaricus subrufescentoides =

Scientific classification
- Kingdom: Fungi
- Division: Basidiomycota
- Class: Agaricomycetes
- Order: Agaricales
- Family: Agaricaceae
- Genus: Agaricus
- Species: A. subrufescentoides

Binomial name
- Agaricus subrufescentoides Murrill

Agaricus subrufescentoides Mycological characteristics
- Gills on hymenium
- Cap is convex or flat
- Hymenium is free
- Stipe has a ring
- Spore print is brown
- Edibility is unknown or poisonous

Agaricus subrufescentoides is a species of mushroom in the family Agaricaceae. It was first described by William Murrill in 1912. Its edibility is unknown, but is suspected to be poisonous due to it being closely related to poisonous species of Agaricus.

== Description ==
The cap of Agaricus subrufescentoides is 3–15 centimeters in diameter and tan in color with a reddish brown spot at the center. The cap starts out round, before becoming convex or flat. The stipe is 5–15 centimeters tall and 1.5-4 centimeters wide, with a ring around it. The gills are free and often start out whitish, before becoming pinkish tan and finally brown with age.

== Habitat and ecology ==
Agaricus subrufescentoides is found in humus and leaf-litter in conifer forests. It fruits during the autumn season.
