= Agaricus alachuanus =

Scientific classification
- Kingdom: Fungi
- Division: Basidiomycota
- Class: Agaricomycetes
- Order: Agaricales
- Family: Nidulariaceae
- Genus: Agaricus
- Species: A. alachuanus

Binomial name
- Agaricus alachuanus Murrill

Species of fungi

Agaricus alachuanus is a species of fungi in the genus Agaricus. It was first described by William Murrill in 1938.
