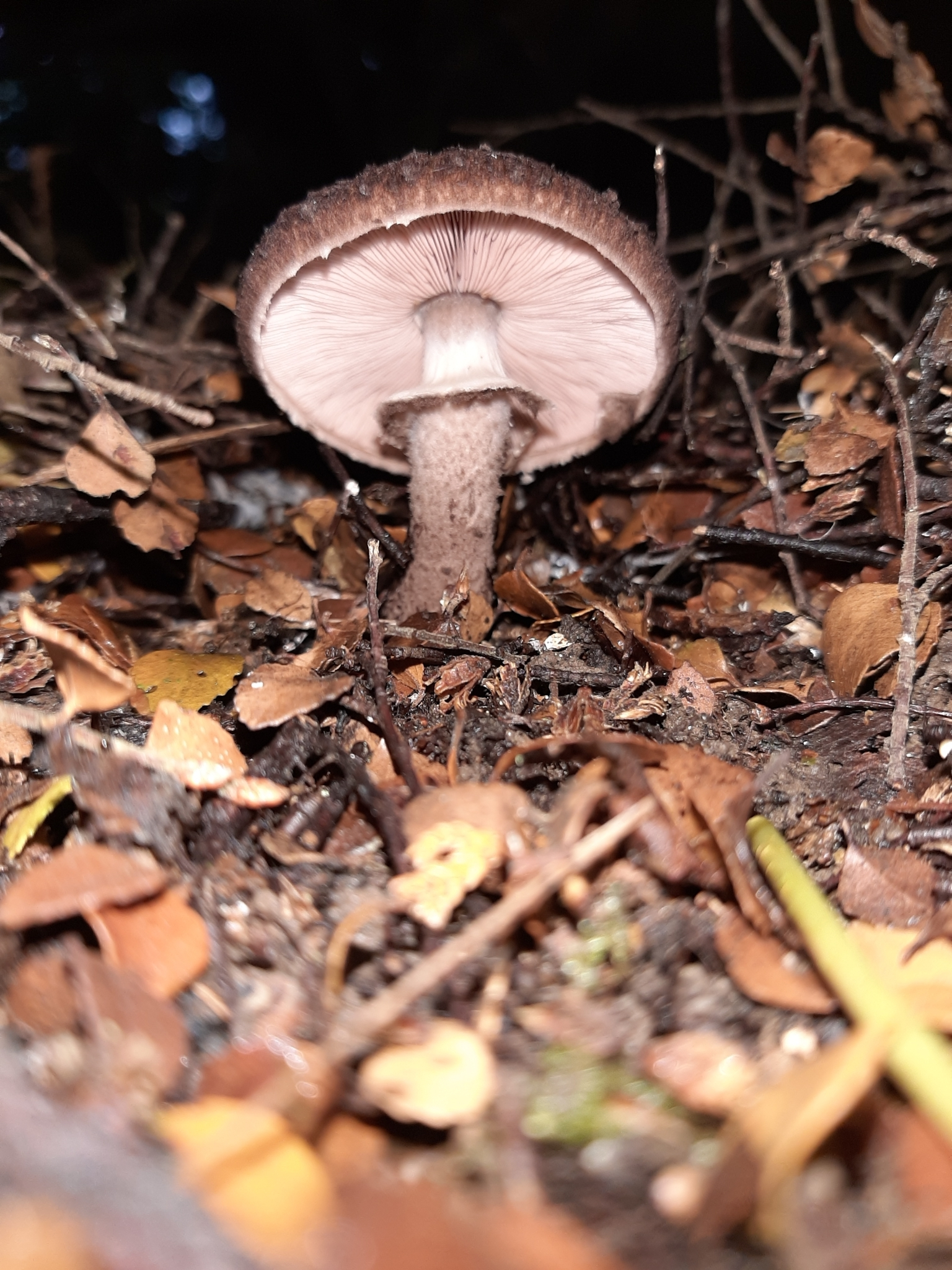
- Agaricus lanatoniger, in Chingford Park (Dunedin, New Zealand)

Scientific classification
- Kingdom: Fungi
- Division: Basidiomycota
- Class: Agaricomycetes
- Order: Agaricales
- Family: Agaricaceae
- Genus: Agaricus
- Species: A. lanatoniger

Binomial name
- Agaricus lanatoniger Heinem. (1974)

= Agaricus lanatoniger =

Species of fungus

Agaricus lanatoniger
- Mycological characteristics
- Gills on hymenium
- Cap is convex
- Hymenium is free
- Stipe has a ring
- Spore print is blackish-brown
- Ecology is saprotrophic
- Edibility is unknown

Agaricus lanatoniger is an agaric fungus in the family Agaricaceae. It is endemic to New Zealand.

== Taxonomy ==
A. lanatoniger was first described in 1974 by Belgian mycologist Paul Heinemann and collected by Egon Horak in December 1967. The holotype specimen was collected in the Westland Province, of New Zealand by Lake Haupiri, underneath red beech (Nothofagus fusca) and rimu (Dacrydium cupressinum) trees. The original paper reference number was incorrect, but is correctly listed as PDD 27107 in a report on New Zealand Agaricus species in 1999.

=== Etymology ===
Lanatoniger originates from the Latin "lanatus" (adj) meaning wooly or downy. This refers to the feltlike texture of its pileus.

== Description ==
The pileus (cap) can vary from a spherical to a convex shape. Smaller specimens tend to have more spherical pileus, while larger are more flattened convex shape, although both have round shape when viewed from above. The dark brown, feltlike cap can be up to 12 cm (4 3/4 in) wide.

The gills consist of thin pink filaments, stemming from the underside of the pileus without touching the stem. This forms a small ring around the stem less than 1 mm (1/16 in) long. About a third of the length of the stem is a 1-mm thick skirt. This extends 10 mm (3/8 in) out from the stem. Above the skirt, the stem is tan or pale colour. While underneath, the colour transitions from light brown to dark brown or black like the cap's colour.

The spores are opaque chocolate brown, ellipsoid and 5.3–6.0 (6.5) X 3.4–3.7 μm in size. The basidia are 18–24 X 6.5–7.2 μm, transparent and have 4 spores each. The gills have abundant transparent cheilocystidia which are pear to club shaped and 20–25 X 7–12 μm.

The stem is 3 to 5 cm (1 1/4 to 2 in) long and 12–14 mm (1/2–1/2 in) thick, generally wider toward the base. Inside the stem is a white, hollow column beginning at gill level but sealed at the bottom. Beneath the ground, the bulbous shape has many small root-like filaments. The stem's insides are white with a hollow center.

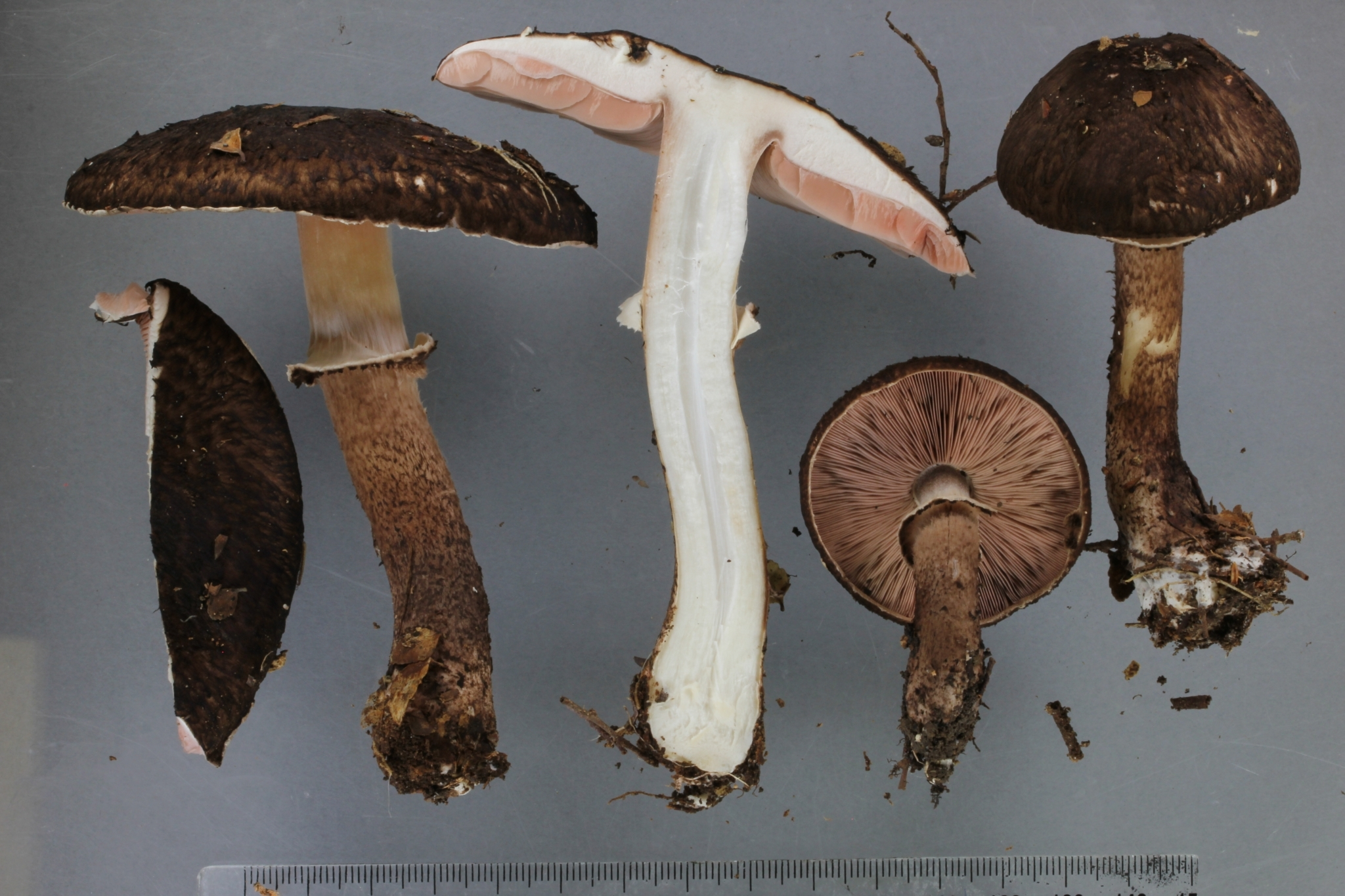

=== Similarity to Agaricus purpureoniger ===
The sequence of A. lanatoniger, when compared to A. purpureoniger differed only by one nucleotide, suggesting that they be the same species. When physically compared, the A. purpureoniger is more purple. However, over the last three decades, all samples of A. purpureoniger have been found in similar locations as A. lanatoniger, specifically in the northwestern regions of both New Zealand islands.

== Distribution and habitat ==
Agaricus lanatoniger has been found in nine different terrestrial locations, primarily in New Zealand. The mean annual temperature for all locations ranges from 6.98–15.10 °C (44.56–59.18 °F). Due to New Zealand's temperate climate, this fluctuates throughout its four distinct seasons. Most samples show the species in the ground of forests, but the type of forest has not been noted.
