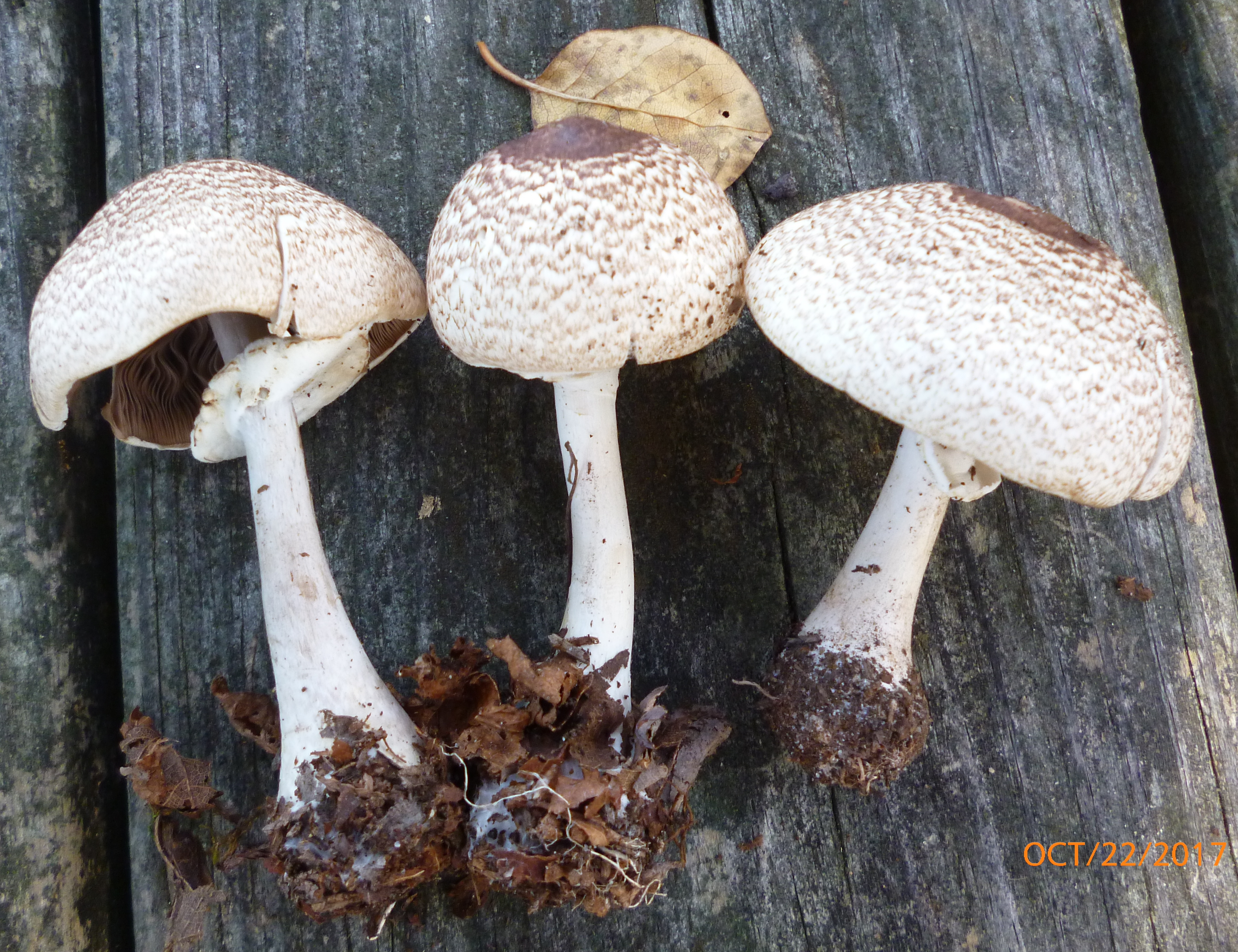

Scientific classification
- Kingdom: Fungi
- Division: Basidiomycota
- Class: Agaricomycetes
- Order: Agaricales
- Family: Agaricaceae
- Genus: Agaricus
- Species: A. vinosobrunneofumidus

Binomial name
- Agaricus vinosobrunneofumidus Kerrigan, 2016

= Agaricus vinosobrunneofumidus =

Species of fungus

Agaricus vinosobrunneofumidus is a species of fungus in the genus Agaricus found in the United States during October and September.
