= List of Hydropus species =

This is a list of the species in the fungal genus Hydropus.

- Hydropus africanus Singer (1948)
- Hydropus albopubescens Singer (1982)
- Hydropus albus Singer (1977)
- Hydropus altus Singer (1982)
- Hydropus amarus de Meijer & Maas Geest. (2009)
- Hydropus amazonicus Singer (1973)
- Hydropus angustispermus Singer (1982)
- Hydropus anthidepas (Berk. & Broome) Singer (1982)
- Hydropus anthracophilus Dennis (1970)
- Hydropus arenarius (A.H. Sm.) Singer (1951)
- Hydropus aristoteliae (Singer) Singer (1962)
- Hydropus athrophylla Maas Geest. & E. Horak (1995)
- Hydropus atramentosus (Kalchbr.) Kotl. & Pouzar (1962)
- Hydropus atropruinosus (Corner) Singer (1982)
- Hydropus aurarius Har. Takah. (2002)
- Hydropus beniensis Singer (1982)
- Hydropus bisporus Singer (1982)
- Hydropus bolivianus Singer (1973)
- Hydropus brunneobasis Singer (1977)
- Hydropus brunneoumbonatus (Dennis) Singer (1982)
- Hydropus caespitosus Singer (1982)
- Hydropus californicus Singer (1989)
- Hydropus camaragibensis Singer (1973)
- Hydropus campinaranae Singer (1982)
- Hydropus cavipes (Pat. & Gaillard) Dennis (1970)
- Hydropus chiriquiensis Singer (1982)
- Hydropus chlorinodorus Singer (1982)
- Hydropus cinchonensis Dennis (1968)
- Hydropus citrinus Singer (1977)
- Hydropus collybioides Gminder (2013)
- Hydropus comptus E. Horak (1987)
- Hydropus confertifolius Singer (1982)
- Hydropus conicus Bas & Weholt (1984)
- Hydropus corneri Singer (1982)
- Hydropus cylindrocystis Pegler (1977)
- Hydropus cylindrosporus (Dennis) Singer (1973)
- Hydropus cystidiatus (Corner) Pegler (1986)
- Hydropus cystidiosus Singer (1989)
- Hydropus decipiens Singer (1982)
- Hydropus depauperatus Singer (1973)
- Hydropus dissiliens Singer (1982)
- Hydropus dryadicola (Kühner) E. Horak (1987)
- Hydropus dubius Singer (1982)
- Hydropus dusenii (Bres.) Singer (1969)
- Hydropus eburneus Maas Geest. (1992)
- Hydropus eitenianus Singer (1973)
- Hydropus excentricus Singer (1982)
- Hydropus fimbriatus Singer (1982)
- Hydropus floccipes (Fr.) Singer (1962)
- Hydropus fluvialis Singer (1982)
- Hydropus fragilior Singer (1982)
- Hydropus fuliginarius (Batsch) Singer (1948)
- Hydropus funebris (Speg.) Singer (1967)
- Hydropus fuscoalbus Singer (1982)
- Hydropus fuscogriseus Singer (1989)
- Hydropus fuscomycelinus Singer (1982)
- Hydropus gerronematoides Singer (1969)
- Hydropus gigasporus (Dennis) Pegler (1983)
- Hydropus glabripes Singer (1969)
- Hydropus globosporus A.C. Cooper, Desjardin & B.A. Perry (2018)
- Hydropus gomezii Singer (1982)
- Hydropus gracilis Singer (1982)
- Hydropus griseolazulinus F.G.B. Pinheiro, Sá & Wartchow (2013)
- Hydropus guaporensis Singer (1982)
- Hydropus heterocystis Singer (1973)
- Hydropus humilior Singer (1982)
- Hydropus hydrophoroides Singer (1982)
- Hydropus hygrophilus Singer (1973)
- Hydropus hymenocephalus (Singer) Redhead (1984)
- Hydropus hyperythrus Singer (1982)
- Hydropus hypnorum Hongo (1959)
- Hydropus hypopolius Singer (1982)
- Hydropus immutabilis Singer (1982)
- Hydropus indicus Singer (1989)
- Hydropus irroratus (Pat.) Singer (1962)
- Hydropus kansaiensis Clémençon & Hongo (1994)
- Hydropus kauffmanii (A.H. Sm.) P.-A. Moreau & Courtec. (2004)
- Hydropus lacuster Singer (1977)
- Hydropus lecythiocystis E.F. Malysheva & Malysheva (2021)
- Hydropus levis Singer (1982)
- Hydropus liciosae Contu & Robich (1998)
- Hydropus lipocystis Singer (1969)
- Hydropus lobauensis (Hauskn. & Krisai) Gminder (2013)
- Hydropus longicystidiatus Gminder (2013)
- Hydropus lutescentipes Singer (1982)
- Hydropus maculatipes Singer (1982)
- Hydropus marginellus (Pers.) Singer (1948)
- Hydropus martensii Singer (1989)
- Hydropus megalobasidium Singer (1982)
- Hydropus mesites Singer (1982)
- Hydropus microcephalus Singer (1982)
- Hydropus montanus Singer (1982)
- Hydropus montis-rosae (Bon & Jamoni) Hauskn. & Krisai (1997)
- Hydropus moserianus Bas (1983)
- Hydropus murinus A.C. Cooper, Desjardin & B.A. Perry (2018)
- Hydropus mutabilis Singer (1977)
- Hydropus mycenoides (Dennis) Singer (1962)
- Hydropus nanus Singer (1982)
- Hydropus nigrita (Berk. & M.A. Curtis) Singer (1973)
- Hydropus nigromarginatus Singer (1982)
- Hydropus nitens Maas Geest. & Hauskn. (1993)
- Hydropus occidentalis Singer (1982)
- Hydropus odoratus Pegler & R.W. Rayner (1969)
- Hydropus omphaliniformis Singer (1973)
- Hydropus panamensis (Singer) Singer (1962)
- Hydropus papillatus Singer (1973)
- Hydropus paradoxus M.M. Moser (1969)
- Hydropus paraensis Singer (1973)
- Hydropus phyllogenus Singer (1982)
- Hydropus pinetorum Singer (1973)
- Hydropus platensis Singer (1973)
- Hydropus platycystis Singer (1982)
- Hydropus porphyrodes (Berk. & Broome) Pegler (1986)
- Hydropus praedecurrens (Murrill) Redhead (1984)
- Hydropus pseudotenax (A.H. Sm.) Esteve-Rav. & A. Ortega (1995)
- Hydropus putredinis (Berk. & M.A. Curtis) Pegler (1987)
- Hydropus pyxidatoides Singer (1969)
- Hydropus recedens Singer (1982)
- Hydropus riograndensis Singer (1954)
- Hydropus rionegrensis Singer (1982)
- Hydropus rugosodiscus (Peck) Matheny (2020)
- Hydropus semimarginellus Singer (1973)
- Hydropus serifluus (Murrill) Singer (1982)
- Hydropus sphaerosporus (Dennis) Dennis (1970)
- Hydropus stenocystis Singer (1977)
- Hydropus subalpinus (Höhn.) Singer (1962)
- Hydropus subcartilagineus (Murrill) Singer (1973)
- Hydropus subspodoides (Murrill) Singer (1973)
- Hydropus subtropicalis (Singer) Singer (1982)
- Hydropus swaneticus (Singer) Singer (1962)
- Hydropus taxodii (Murrill) Singer (1951)
- Hydropus terraefirmae Singer (1982)
- Hydropus trichoderma (Joss.) Singer (1962)
- Hydropus tubiformis (Beeli) Pegler (1983)
- Hydropus tucumanus Singer (1982)
- Hydropus umbrinus (A.H. Sm.) Singer (1951)
- Hydropus verae-crucis Singer (1973)
- Hydropus viscidulus Singer (1969)
- Hydropus xanthosarx Singer & Grinling (1967)
- Hydropus xerophilus Singer (1973)
- Hydropus xuchiliensis (Murrill) Singer (1982)
- Hydropus xuthophyllus Singer (1973)
