= Psilocybe germanica =

Scientific classification
- Kingdom: Fungi
- Division: Basidiomycota
- Class: Agaricomycetes
- Order: Agaricales
- Family: Hymenogastraceae
- Genus: Psilocybe
- Species: P. germanica

Binomial name
- Psilocybe germanica Gartz & Wiedemann, nom. inval. (2015)

Species of fungus

Psilocybe germanica is an invalidly described (Art. F.5.1. of the Code) species of psychedelic mushroom in the family Hymenogastraceae. It was described as a new species in 2015 by Jochen Gartz and Georg Wiedemann. DNA sequencing of the balls of P. germanica has found that it is a synonym of P. serbica.

== Description ==
Psilocybe germanica has produces fruitbodies with broadly umbonate caps measuring 1–4 cm (0.4–1.6 in) in diameter. They are a deep brown color when moist, but become whitish when dry, and the gills are initially brownish before becoming purplish-brown when the spores mature. The whitish, curved stipe measures 5–9 cm (2.0–3.5 in) long by 0.3–0.7 cm (0.12–0.28 in) thick, and is thicker at the top. It is initially stuffed with mycelia but later hollows, and the wood substrate under the mushroom is held together by rhizomorphs at the base of the stipe. The cap and stipe bruise blue when touched, while the umbo typically becomes gray-bluish on its own. Frosts or rains often cause an intense bluing reaction.

Spores measure 9–12 by 5.5–7.5 μm, and have a germ pore. Cheilocystidia (cystidia on the gill edges) are lageniform (flask-shaped), measuring 25–33 by 6.0–8.3 μm; pleurocystidia (cystidia on the gill faces) are absent from the hymenium.

== Habitat and distribution ==
A saprobic species, Psilocybe germanica grows on wood chips, or bark chips mixed with soil. Found in parks, fruiting occurs from September to December. It is known only from Germany.

== See also ==
- List of Psilocybe species
- List of Psilocybin mushrooms
- Psilocybe germanica ITS holotype sequence
- Psilocybe germanica LSU holotype sequence
