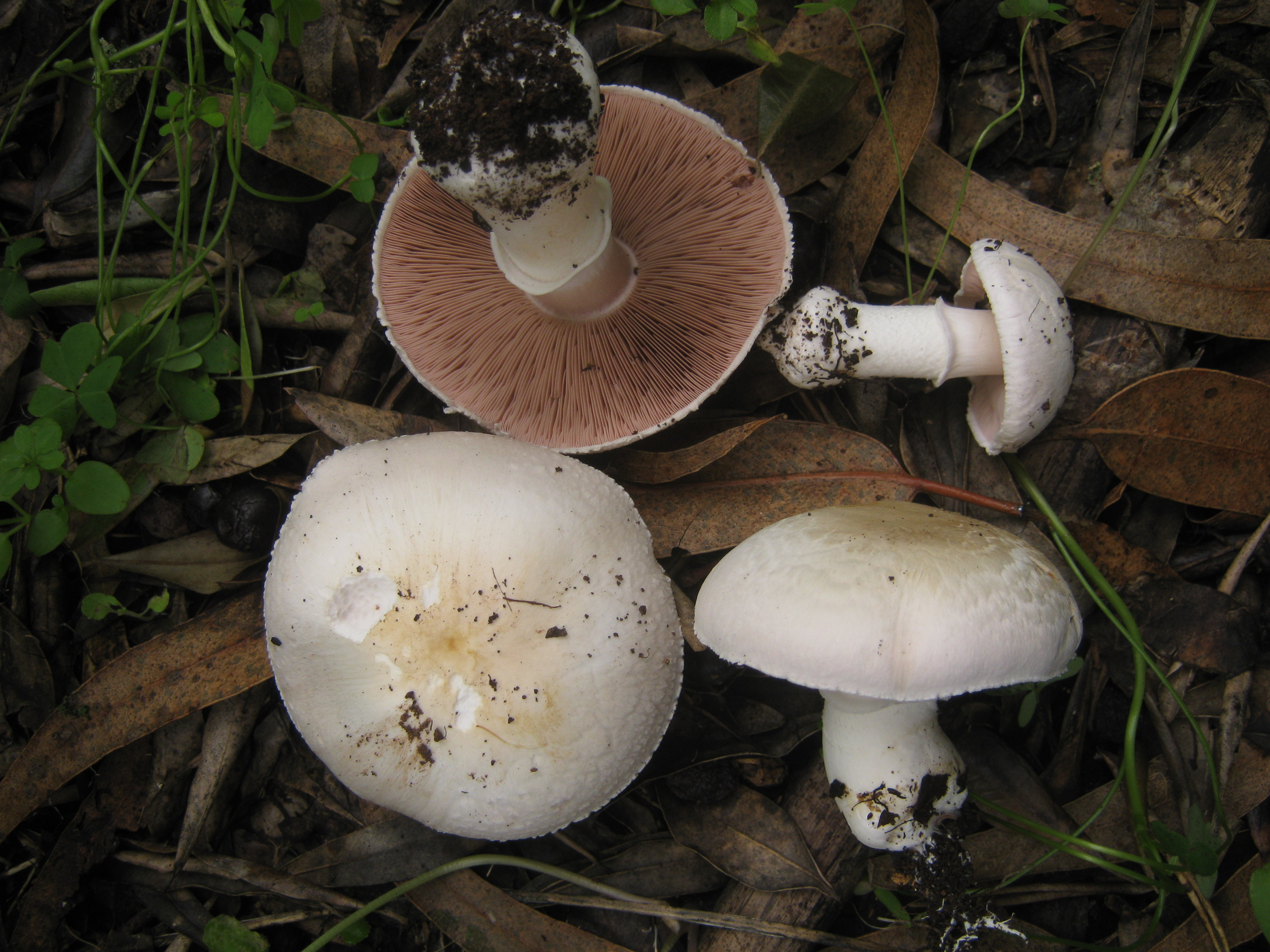

Scientific classification
- Kingdom: Fungi
- Division: Basidiomycota
- Class: Agaricomycetes
- Order: Agaricales
- Family: Agaricaceae
- Genus: Agaricus
- Species: A. bresadolanus

Binomial name
- Agaricus bresadolanus Bohus (1969)

Synonyms
- Agaricus campestris var. radicatus Vittad. (1835); Agaricus radicatus (Vittad.) Romagn. (1938); Psalliota radicata (Vittad.) R.Sandor (1958); Psalliota radicata var. crassanulata R.Sandor (1958); Agaricus romagnesii Wasser (1977)

= Agaricus bresadolanus =

Species of fungus

Agaricus bresadolanus (parkland mushroom) is a species of fungus in the genus Agaricus. Its spores are ellipsoid and lack a germ pore, with dimensions of 5.5–7.5 by 4.0–5.0 μm.

It was described by Hungarian mycologist Gábor Bohus in 1969. A rare species, it has been recorded in Asia and southern Europe, where it fruits singly or in groups along paths and in grassy area of deciduous woodland.

== Toxicity ==
While generally considered edible, a small number of reports of severe stomach pain after ingestion suggest that it might be somewhat poisonous.

== See also ==
- List of Agaricus species
