= Stephanopus =

Scientific classification
- Kingdom: Fungi
- Division: Basidiomycota
- Class: Agaricomycetes
- Order: Agaricales
- Family: Cortinariaceae
- Genus: Stephanopus; M.M.Moser & E.Horak (1975)

Type species
- Stephanopus azureus M.M.Moser & E.Horak (1975)

Species
- S. azureus S. coerulea S. stropharioides S. trachyphyloeus S. vilchensis

Genus of fungi

Stephanopus is a genus of fungi in the family Cortinariaceae. The genus, circumscribed by mycologists Meinhard Moser and Egon Horak in 1975, contains five species found in South America.

== See also ==
- List of Agaricales genera
