= Gábor Bohus =

Hungarian mycologist

- Born: July 4, 1914; Budapest, Hungary
- Died: March 30, 2005 (aged 90); Budapest, Hungary
- Scientific career
- Fields: Biology, Mycology, Museologist

Gábor Bohus (1914–2005) was a Hungarian mycologist born on 4 July 1914 in Budapest. After World War II, he rebuilt the mushroom collection at the Hungarian Academy of Sciences and developed a modified method for preserving specimens that is still used by the Hungarian Natural History Museum.

== Early life ==
Gábor Bohus was born to Paula Kitschalesz and Róbert Bohus on 4 July 1914. Paula maintained a garden at home and Róbert was a student of László Szemere's mushroom study course so Gábor was exposed to the plants and mushrooms that he would spend his life studying from a young age. He graduated from the Lutheran high school in Fasor and went on to study at the Faculty of Natural Sciences of the Pázmány Péter University from 1932 to 1937 where he studied botany, chemistry and mineralogy. His 1937 doctoral dissertation explored artificial breeding of Clasterosporium carpophilum with mushrooms.

Gábor then joined the Museum of Natural Sciences in 1937 and became an unpaid intern at the botanical garden before being granted a scholarship. Between 1938 and 1945 he was called up for military service several times and spent a total of 45 months in service however he continued his research into mushrooms during the war and kept a microscope with him even whilst in service. Despite his military service he was still able to publish dozens of papers during this time.

== Career ==
Gábor became the deputy head of the Botanical Garden at the Hungarian Academy of Sciences after World War II but the mushroom collection had been lost, despite being removed to the countryside to try to prevent it from being destroyed by bombing. He therefore set to rebuilding the collection of preserved specimens along with Lórántné Babos and developed the modified Herpell method of preserving mushroom specimens. Margit Babos worked under Bohus and used this method to prepare over 20,000 mushroom specimens for the macrofungi collection. This method is still used by the Hungarian Natural History Museum today and a large amount of the macroscopic fungi specimens it holds were prepared by Bohus and Babos.

Gábor worked at the botanical gardens and museum for nearly 68 years before retiring in 1974 due to hearing loss caused by high blood pressure. He continued to regularly visit and work with mushrooms until his death in 2005 aged 90.

== Species described ==
Bohus published numerous papers on Agaricus species and was responsible for describing many species including:

- Agaricus annulospecialis
- Agaricus babosiae
- Agaricus bernardiiformis
- Agaricus bobosi
- Agaricus bresadolanus
- Agaricus cappellii
- Agaricus macrosporoides
- Agaricus pseudoumbrella
- Agaricus silvicolae-similis
- Armillaria rickenii
- Coprinus mitrisporus
- Cortinarius ammophiloides
- Cortinarius diabolicorigens
- Cortinarius moserianus
- Cortinarius paracephalixus
- Cortinarius parfumatus
- Cortinarius subcompar
- Hebeloma ammophilum
- Hebeloma ochroalbidum
- Hebeloma psammicola
- Lepista irinoides
- Psalliota pseudopratensis

The species variant Tricholoma populinum var. bohusii is named for Gábor Bohus as a commemoration of his work in Hungarian mycology. Other species named for Bohus include Lepista bohusii which was described based on Bohus' variant Lepista luscina var. irinoides, Agaricus bohusii and Leucoagaricus bohusii (originally Leucocoprinus bohusi).

== Publications ==
During his life Bohus authored or co-authored a number of books and journals on plants and mushrooms. This is a partial list:

- 1937 Mesterséges tenyésztési kísérletek a Clasterosporium carpophilum (Lév.) Aderh. gombával
- 1942 Über die Giftigkeit der "Weissen" Clitocyben. (Clitocybe corda Schulz.)
- 1944 Enumeratio critica Boletorum Hungariae.
- 1944 A magyarországi Boletue-dk kritikai felsorolása.
- 1951 Magyarország kalaposgombáinak meghatározó kézikönyve. Irta: Bohus G., Kalmár Zoltán, Ubrizsy Gábor. (A rajzokat Lakatos Mária készítette.)
- 1952 Növénytársulások, életfeltételek, a gombafajok száma és mennyisége a budaihegységi Hársbokorhegyen és környékén.
- 1953 A búza kőüszögjét okozó Tilletia-fajok hő- és talajnedvességi igényére vonatkozó vizsgálatok.
- 1953 Magyarország virágtalan növényeinek kézikönyve
- 1953 Magyarország virágtalan növényeinek határozó. Rész 2, Magyarország nagygombái a kalaposgombák kivételével
- 1953 Magyarország nagygombái a kalaposgombák kivételével : II. rész
- 1954 A kalaposgombákra (Agaricales) vonatkozó rendszertani és ökológiai kutatások eredményei 1
- 1954. A csiperkegomba termésmennyiségének növelésére irányuló kutatások
- 1954 A Hársbokor-hegy környékén lévő erdőtársulásokban termő gomba súlyára vonatkozó mérések és számítások
- 1955 Fenolszármazékok fungicid hatása.
- 1956 On the drought-resistance of Fungi.
- 1957 The effects of temperature and pressure on fungi causing wood-decay.
- 1957 On the results of researches concerning the temperature claims of macroscopic fungi.
- 1959-1962 Magyarország kultúrflórája 1/A., 1/B. köt Virágtalanok
- 1960 Notes on the occurrence in Hungary of Russula species, with regard to their range in Europe.
- 1960 Coenology of terricolous macroscopic fungi of deciduous forests. Contributions to our knowledge of their behaviour in Hungary
- 1960 Notes on the occurrence in Hungary of Russula species, with regard to their range in Europe.
- 1961 Psalliota studies. I.: Critical species, critical notes.
- 1961 A termesztett csiperke : 39 ábrával
- 1961 Erdő-mező gombái
- 1961-1962 Virágtalanok. Füzet F/1-F/2, Függelék
- 1962 Der Formenkreis des Agaricus (Psalliota) bisporus (Lange) Treschow und die Benützung der wildwachsenden Formen (Sorten) beim Züchtungsverfahren.
- 1962 A kalaposgombákra /Agaricales-re/ vonat-kozó rendszertani és ökológiai vizsgálatok eredményei, V.
- 1963 A gombacönológiai kutatás módszertana. (Methodology of myco-coenological research of fungi)
- 1966 Leucopaxillus-Arten in Ungarn
- 1966 Savanyú talajú lomberdők mikocönológiai vizsgálata Magyarországon. (The mycocoenological investigation of acidophilous deciduous forests in Hungary).
- 1967 Mycocoenological investigation of acidophilous deciduous forests in Hungary
- 1969 Agaricus studies II.
- 1970 Interessantere Cortinarius-Arten aus dem Karpaten-Becken.
- 1970 A kalaposgombákra (Agaricales) vonatkozó rendszertani és ökológiai kutatások eredményei. VI.
- 1971 Agaricus studies III.
- 1972 Hebeloma studies I.
- 1973 Soil acidity and the occurrence of fungi in deciduous forests.
- 1973 Adatok a talajlakó nagygombák szerepéhez lomberdei ökoszisztémákban. (Data to the role of terricolous macrofungi in deciduous forest ecosystems).
- 1974 Agaricus studies, IV.
- 1975 Agaricus studies, V.
- 1975 A Kárpát-medence Agaricus fajainak áttekin-tése. Agaricus species in Carpathian Basin.
- 1976 Agaricus studies, VI.
- 1976 Interessantere Cortinarius-Arten aus dem Karpaten-Becken, II.
- 1977 Fungorum rariorum icones coloratae. 8
- 1978 Hebeloma studies, II. (Basidiomycetes, Cortinariaceae).
- 1978 Agaricus studies, VIII. (Basidiomycetes, Agaricaceae).
- 1979 Interessante Cortinarius-Arten aus dem Karpaten-Becken (Agaricales, Cortinariaceae), III.
- 1979 Termőhelyismeret. – Középfokú gombaismerő i tanfolyam jegyzete, Budapest
- 1979 Some results of systematical and ecological research on Agaricales, VII.
- 1980 Agaricus studies, IX. (Basidiomycetes, Agaricaceae). Agaricus flora in the Carpathian Basin.
- 1981 Some results of systematical and ecological research on Agaricales, VIII.
- 1983 Some results of systematical and ecological research on Agaricales, IX.
- 1984 Erdőtípusok talajlakó gombacönózisainak néhány jellemzőjéről, összefüggéséről - Mikológiai Közlemények
- 1984 Studies on the pH requirement of soil-inhabiting mushrooms: the R-spectra of mushroom assemblages in deciduous forest communities. - Acta Botanica Hungarica
- 1985 Tricholoma sectio Iorigida Sing. in Europe and North Africa.
- 1989 Agaricus studies, X. (Basidiomycetes, Agaricaceae).
- 1990 Agaricus studies, XI. (Basidiomycetes, Agaricaceae). A monographical key.
- 1991 Zwei neue Pilztaxa aus Ungarn (Basidiomycetes, Agaricales).
- 1994 Magyarország csiperke gombái. (The Agaricus species in Hungary)
- 1998 Genetic resource collection of macrofungi in Hungary.
- 1999 Two new fungus species from Hungary (Basidiomycetes, Agaricales).
- 1999-2000 Diagnoses latinae of the new subsections of the subgenus Agaricus.
- 2001 Vizsgálatok az immunstimuláns Lentinus cyathiformis (Schff.: Fr.) Bres. ökológiájára vonatkozóan 1.
- 2003 Vizsgálatok az immunstimuláns Lentinus cyathiformis (Schff.: Fr.) Bres. ökológiájára vonatkozóan 2.
- 2005 Psalliota/Agaricus studies I-XIII
