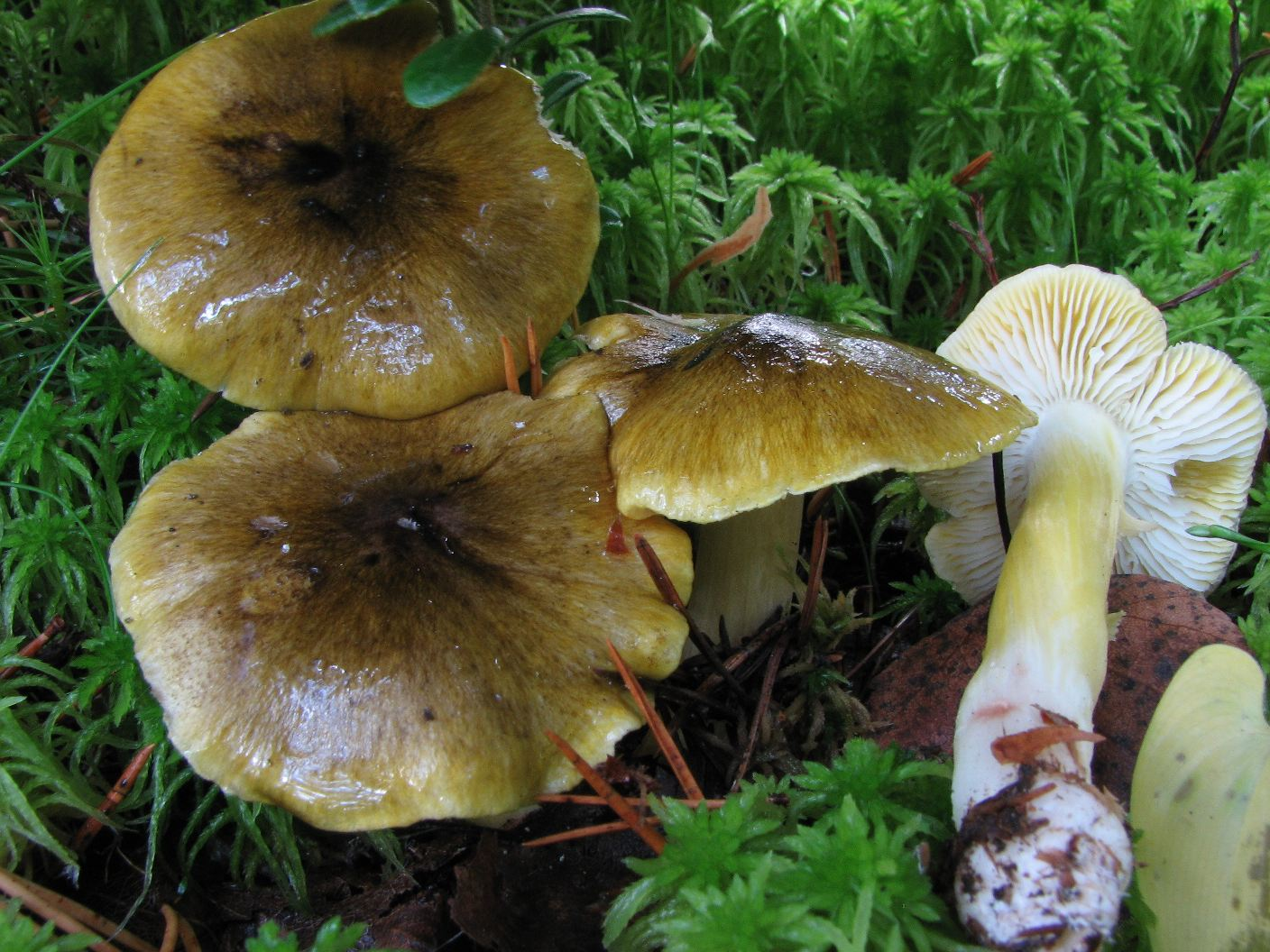

Scientific classification
- Domain: Eukaryota
- Kingdom: Fungi
- Division: Basidiomycota
- Class: Agaricomycetes
- Order: Agaricales
- Family: Tricholomataceae
- Genus: Tricholoma
- Species: T. viridilutescens

Binomial name
- Tricholoma viridilutescens M.M.Moser (1978)

= Tricholoma viridilutescens =

Species of fungus

Tricholoma viridilutescens is a species of fungus belonging to the family Tricholomataceae.

It is native to Europe.
