= Entoloma moserianum =

Scientific classification
- Kingdom: Fungi
- Division: Basidiomycota
- Class: Agaricomycetes
- Order: Agaricales
- Family: Entolomataceae
- Genus: Entoloma
- Species: E. moserianum

Binomial name
- Entoloma moserianum Noordel. (1983)

Species of mushroom-forming fungus

Entoloma moserianum is a species of mushroom-forming fungus in the family Entolomataceae. First described from the Netherlands in 1983, this mushroom has whitish to cream-coloured caps that develop distinctive yellow stains when bruised or aged. The species favours deciduous forests on clay and limestone soils, where it forms relationships with trees such as oak, ash and lime. Known primarily from floodplain forests in the Netherlands, Germany, Austria and Italy, Entoloma moserianum fruits in both spring and autumn months.

== Taxonomy ==
It was described as new to science in 1983 by Machiel Noordeloos. It is placed in the family Entolomataceae (order Agaricales, class Agaricomycetes) and assigned to Entoloma sect. Entoloma on account of its non‑hygrophanous, smooth pileus, angular isodiametric spores and ixocutis‑type pileipellis. The species is similar to E. sinuatum. The specific epithet honours the Austrian mycologist Meinhard Michael Moser.

The holotype specimen (Bas & Kuyper 7896) was collected on 25 August 1982 in Marienwaard, municipality of Geldermalsen, province of Gelderland, the Netherlands, growing on river‑plain deciduous forest floor beneath Quercus, Fraxinus and Tilia. The holotype is preserved at the Rijksherbarium (L).

== Description ==
Entoloma moserianum produces a fruiting body (basidiocarp) with a cap 20–95 mm across. The cap is conico‑convex to broadly expanded, occasionally bearing a weak umbo. Its surface is smooth and non‑hygrophanous (not changing colour on drying), appearing felty when dry and slightly viscid when wet. Colour ranges from white to cream or ivory, sometimes with a yellowish centre. A distinct feature is the cap's tendency to stain bright yellow when bruised or with age.

The gills are subdistant (widely spaced), thick and initially white with a faint yellow tinge, turning pale pink as the spores mature. Their edges are finely serrate (toothed) and remain the same colour as the gill faces. The stipe is firm, 40–100 mm long by 5–14 mm thick, and strongly fibrillose‑costate (marked by fibre‑like longitudinal ridges). It is white to cream, developing bright yellow spots on bruising or ageing, and the apex is pruinose‑scurfy (covered in a fine, powdery bloom).

The flesh (context) is compact and white, though some specimens develop an orange tinge when cut. The odour shifts from acidulous‑soaplike (slightly sour and soap‑like) when fresh to distinctly farinaceous (meal‑like) when disturbed, and the taste is described as farinaceous‑rancid. Basidiospores measure 9.3–11.5 by 8.1–9.3 μm, are 5–6‑angled in side view and pale pink at maturity. Cheilocystidia are cylindrico‑clavate (cylindrical to club‑shaped), measuring 22–60 by 4–8 μm.

== Habitat and distribution ==
Entoloma moserianum inhabits deciduous forests on heavy river clay soils and humus-rich calcareous soil. The type locality in the Mariënwaard estate, Gelderland, Netherlands, featured the species growing abundantly across several spots under mixed deciduous trees, primarily consisting of Quercus (oak), Fraxinus (ash), and Tilia (lime). This environment represents a type of floodplain forest that is characterised by periodic flooding and nutrient-rich clay deposits.

The species is associated with similar habitats found in southern Germany and Austria, known as Auenwälder or floodplain forests. These ecosystems provide ideal conditions with their moist, fertile soils and established deciduous tree communities. In Italy, it has been found in sunny broadleaved woodland on calcareous soil at around 200 m elevation, consisting of Ulmus minor, Corylus avellana, Acer campestre, and Robinia pseudoacacia, with Ruscus aculeatus present in the understory.

At the time of its original publication, Entoloma moserianum has been recorded only from its type locality in the Netherlands. The single documented collection from August 1982 yielded numerous specimens, suggesting that the species may be locally abundant when conditions are favourable. The Mariënwaard estate is recognised as a significant location for rare mushroom species in the Netherlands, indicating that the species may require specific ecological conditions found in remnant river-plain forests. It has since been documented from several European countries including the Netherlands, Germany, Austria, and Italy. The Italian collections from Veneto, Vicenza, demonstrate that the species appears in April, May, June, July, and October, suggesting it is neither strictly thermophilous nor cryophilous.

== See also ==
- List of Entoloma species
