= Anamika (fungus) =

Scientific classification
- Kingdom: Fungi
- Division: Basidiomycota
- Class: Agaricomycetes
- Order: Agaricales
- Family: Hymenogastraceae
- Genus: Anamika; K.A.Thomas, Peintner, M.M.Moser & Manim.

Type species
- Anamika indica K.A.Thomas, Peintner, M.M.Moser & Manim.

Species
- A. angustilamellata A. indica A. lactariolens

Genus of fungi

Anamika is a genus of fungi in the family Hymenogastraceae. Anamika was formerly placed in the family Cortinariaceae, but a molecular phylogenetics study found it to be closely related to Hebeloma, which is in the family Hymenogastraceae. Species of Anamika have small basidiocarps with non-hygrophanous caps that are smooth, glabrous and slightly sticky when moist; a pileus margin that is incurved and entire when young and becomes decurved and fissile with age; and a pale brown context. Their lamellae are adnate; their stipes are central, terete, equal or enlarged towards both ends, slightly furfuraceous with a cortina when young, which often leaves inconspicuous annular remnants. Their spore prints are brown. Their spores are amygdaliform to sublimoniform, thick-walled, epitunica strongly developed with cavernous type of ornamentation, with a conspicuous callus and without germ-pore. The edges of their lamellae are sterile with cheilocystidia; pleurocystidia present similar to cheilocystidia. Their hymenophoral trama is regular. Their pileipellis an epicutis, repent thin-walled hyphae with pale brownish incrustation. Their caulocystidia occur in small clusters or scattered. Clamp connections are present in all tissues.

== Distribution ==
Anamika species are known from India, Thailand, China and Japan. Anamika indica has been recorded from semi-evergreen to evergreen forests in the Western Ghats, Kerala, India. It occurs solitary, gregarious to scattered on soil under Dipterocarpus sp. probably forming ectomycorrhiza.
