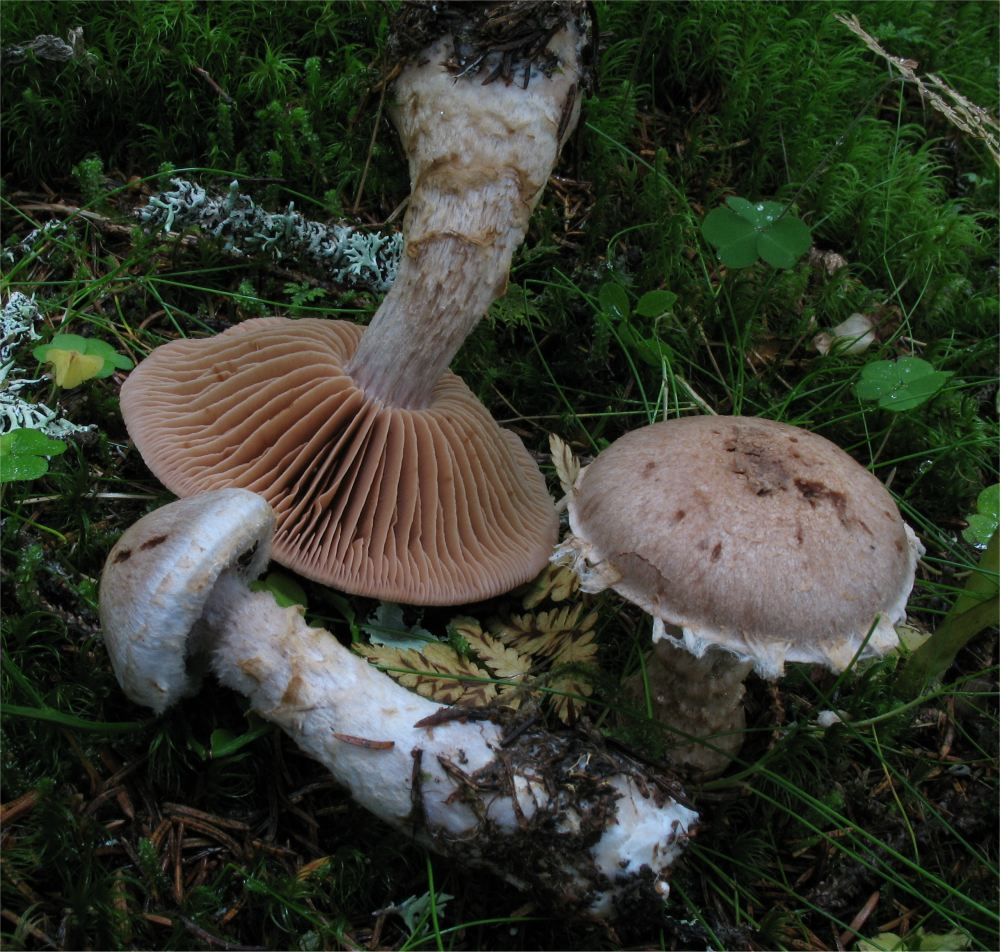

Scientific classification
- Kingdom: Fungi
- Division: Basidiomycota
- Class: Agaricomycetes
- Order: Agaricales
- Family: Cortinariaceae
- Genus: Cortinarius
- Species: C. canabarba

Binomial name
- Cortinarius canabarba M.M. Moser

= Cortinarius canabarba =

Species of fungus

Cortinarius canabarba is a fungus of the genus Cortinarius native to Europe. It was described by Austrian mycologist Meinhard Michael Moser in 1966.
