= Tricholoma moserianum =

Scientific classification
- Domain: Eukaryota
- Kingdom: Fungi
- Division: Basidiomycota
- Class: Agaricomycetes
- Order: Agaricales
- Family: Tricholomataceae
- Genus: Tricholoma
- Species: T. moserianum

Binomial name
- Tricholoma moserianum Bon (1990)

Species of mushroom-forming fungus

Tricholoma moserianum is a little-known European mushroom-forming fungus of the agaric genus Tricholoma and family Tricholomataceae. Described as a new species in 1990, it is found in France, where it forms ectomycorrhizal associations with tree in French woodlands. The fungus make a white cap up to 5 cm in diameter with free gills.

== Taxonomy ==
The fungus was formally described in 1989 by the French mycologist Marcel Bon. The type specimen was collected by Bon in a deciduous woodland in France. The specific epithet honours the Austrian mycologist Meinhard Moser.

== Description ==
Tricholoma moserianum has a cap (pileus) that is 3–5 cm in diameter, which is convex and smooth with a predominantly white colouration that sometimes has an ochre centre. The gills (lamellae) are white in colour, immutable (not changing colour if bruised), and crowded together. They are not attached to the stipe (described as free or slightly emarginate).

The stipe is 5–6 cm (2.0–2.4 inches) tall and 4–7 mm wide, appearing smooth or with occasional scales toward the apex. Like the cap, it is predominantly white with slightly yellowish tones. The spores are broadly elliptical and relatively small for the genus, measuring 4–5 μm by 3–4 μm. The fungus produces white spore prints.

The flesh of the fruit body is white, immutable, and has a greyish appearance in the stipe. It was described as having an earthy odour.

== Habitat and distribution ==
This species is found in continental forests, where it forms a type of symbiotic relationship (ectomycorrhizal association) with trees.

== See also ==
- List of Tricholoma species
