= Cortinarius moserianus =

Scientific classification
- Kingdom: Fungi
- Division: Basidiomycota
- Class: Agaricomycetes
- Order: Agaricales
- Family: Cortinariaceae
- Genus: Cortinarius
- Species: C. moserianus

Binomial name
- Cortinarius moserianus Bohus (1970)

Species of fungus

Cortinarius moserianus is a rare agaric fungus in the family Cortinariaceae. It was described as new to science in 1970 by the Hungarian mycologist Gábor Bohus, from collections made in Hungary.

== Taxonomy ==
Cortinarius moserianus was published by Gabor Bohus in Annales Historico-Naturales Musei Nationalis Hungarici. The specific epithet moserianus honours the professor Meinhard Moser for his contributions to Cortinarius systematics. The type material was collected on 12 October 1966 at Üllő (Pest County, Hungary) in a cultivated oak woodland (Quercetum cultum) on sandy soil. Bohus noted that Moser found no matching descriptions in both European and non-European sources and tentatively suggested that the species might best fit within the group then circumscribed as Sericocybe.

== Description ==
The cap (pileus) is 2.5–7.5 cm across, initially flat-convex to somewhat depressed, with the margin inrolled when young and often with small notches. When moist it may feel slightly sticky to the touch, but dries to a silky sheen. Fresh specimens are pure white, sometimes with a faint milky-coffee tint at the margin; young caps are covered entirely by a fine, membranous universal veil that breaks away in concentric patches, leaving a smooth or fibrous cap surface. The gills are crowded, initially pale clay-coloured to light coffee-brown, turning bright ochre-rust with maturity; they are broadly attached to the stipe by a shallow notch.

The stipe measures 2–4.5 cm long and 0.7–1.5 cm thick, with a swollen or slightly bulbous base up to 3 cm across. It is white when young, often clothed in veil fibres that form a white, cobweb-like partial veil (cortina) between cap and stipe. The flesh is whitish, sometimes tinged brownish in the cap or stipe, and turns brown on drying. The odour is weak, and the taste slightly radish-like.

Viewed under the microscope, the spores measure 8–10 by 4.5–5 μm, almond-shaped with a characteristically tapered apex, and are finely punctate, giving them a yellowish-brown hue. The basidia are club-shaped, four-spored, and measure 25–30 by 7–9 μm. The gill tissue (trama) is made up of regular hyphal filaments about 8–26 μm thick, and veil hyphae bear clamp connections. No distinct subcutis layer was observed. Chemical tests on fresh tissue are negative with potassium hydroxide, ammonia, and ferrous sulfate, but give a faint dirty-purplish reaction with aniline phenol.

== Habitat and distribution ==
At the time of its original publication, Cortinarius moserianus was known only from its original locality in central Hungary. Fruit bodies were found in October in sandy soils under cultivated oak forests (Quercetum cultum) near Üllő, Pest County. Additional collections were made in the same woodland in October 1966 and September 1967, but there are no records of this species elsewhere. In the 1995 red list of Hungarian macrofungi, C. moserianus was listed as a "care-demanding species", referring to "macrofungi which became endangered because of the mass gathering and selling as well as those species, which are still not rare, but are decaying mycorrhizal companions of forest trees or important representatives of the characteristic mycoflora of Hungary".

== See also ==
- List of Cortinarius species
