= Meinhard Michael Moser =

Austrian mycologist (1924–2002)

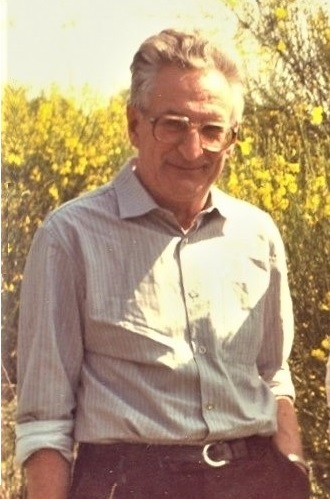
- Moser, c. 1980s
- Born: 13 March 1924; Innsbruck, Austria
- Died: 30 September 2002 (aged 78); Innsbruck, Austria
- Education: University of Innsbruck
- Scientific career
- Fields: Mycology
- Workplaces: University of Innsbruck
- Author abbrev. (botany): M.M.Moser

Meinhard Michael Moser (13 March 1924 – 30 September 2002) was an Austrian mycologist. His work principally concerned the taxonomy, chemistry, and toxicity of the gilled mushrooms (Agaricales), especially those of the genus Cortinarius, and the ecology of ectomycorrhizal relationships. His contributions to the Kleine Kryptogamenflora von Mitteleuropa series of mycological guidebooks were well regarded and widely used. In particular, his 1953 Blätter- und Bauchpilze (Agaricales und Gastromycetes) [The Gilled and Gasteroid Fungi (Agaricales and Gastromycetes)], which became known as simply "Moser", saw several editions in both the original German and in translation. Other important works included a 1960 monograph on the genus Phlegmacium (sometimes considered part of Cortinarius) and a 1975 study of members of Cortinarius, Dermocybe, and Stephanopus in South America, co-authored with the mycologist Egon Horak.

After showing interest in natural sciences in his youth, Moser studied at the University of Innsbruck. His university career began during World War II however, and was soon interrupted by military service. Stationed as a translator in eastern Europe, he was captured and placed in a prisoner-of-war camp. He was released in 1948, subsequently returning to Innsbruck to complete his studies. After completing his doctorate in 1950, Moser worked in England for six months, researching the symbiotic relationships between plants and fungi. Upon his return to Austria, he joined the Federal Forestry Research Institute, where he remained until 1968, conducting influential research on the use of mycorrhizal fungi in reforestation. He began lecturing at the University of Innsbruck in 1956, and in 1972 became the inaugural head of the first Institute of Microbiology in Austria. He remained with the Institute until his retirement in 1991, and his scientific studies continued until his death in 2002. An influential mycologist who described around 500 new taxa, Moser received awards throughout his life, and numerous fungal taxa have been named in his honour.

== Life and career ==
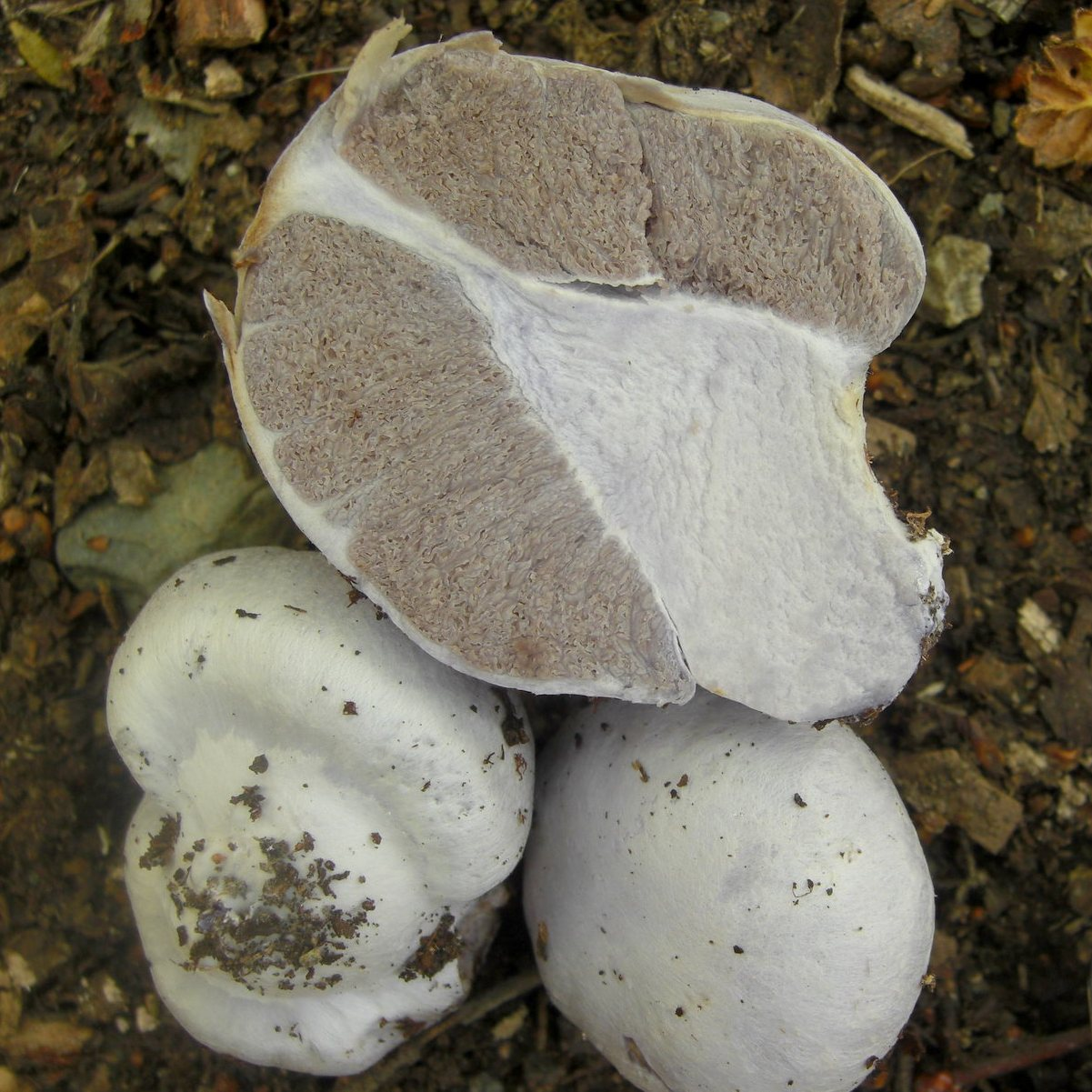
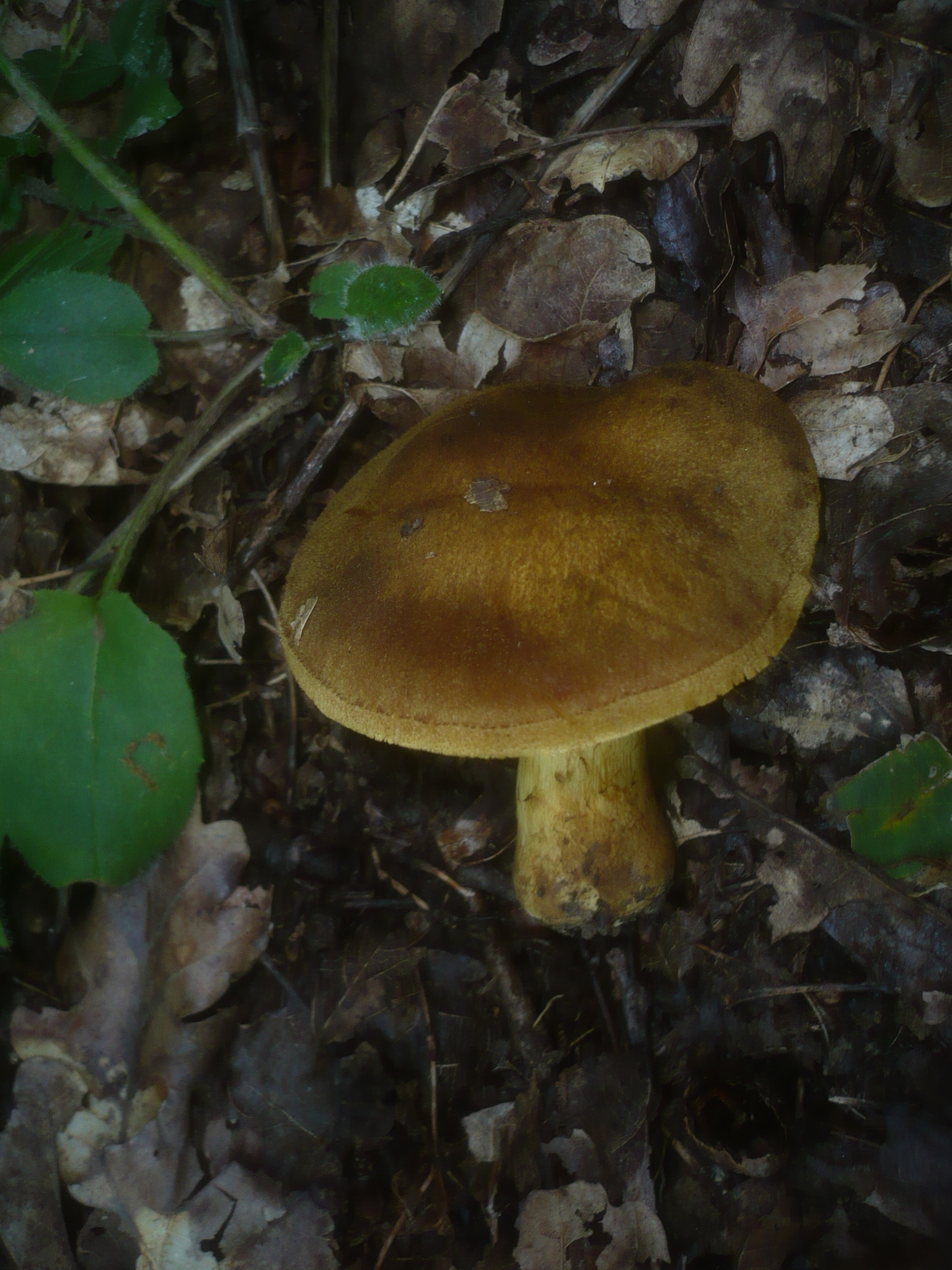
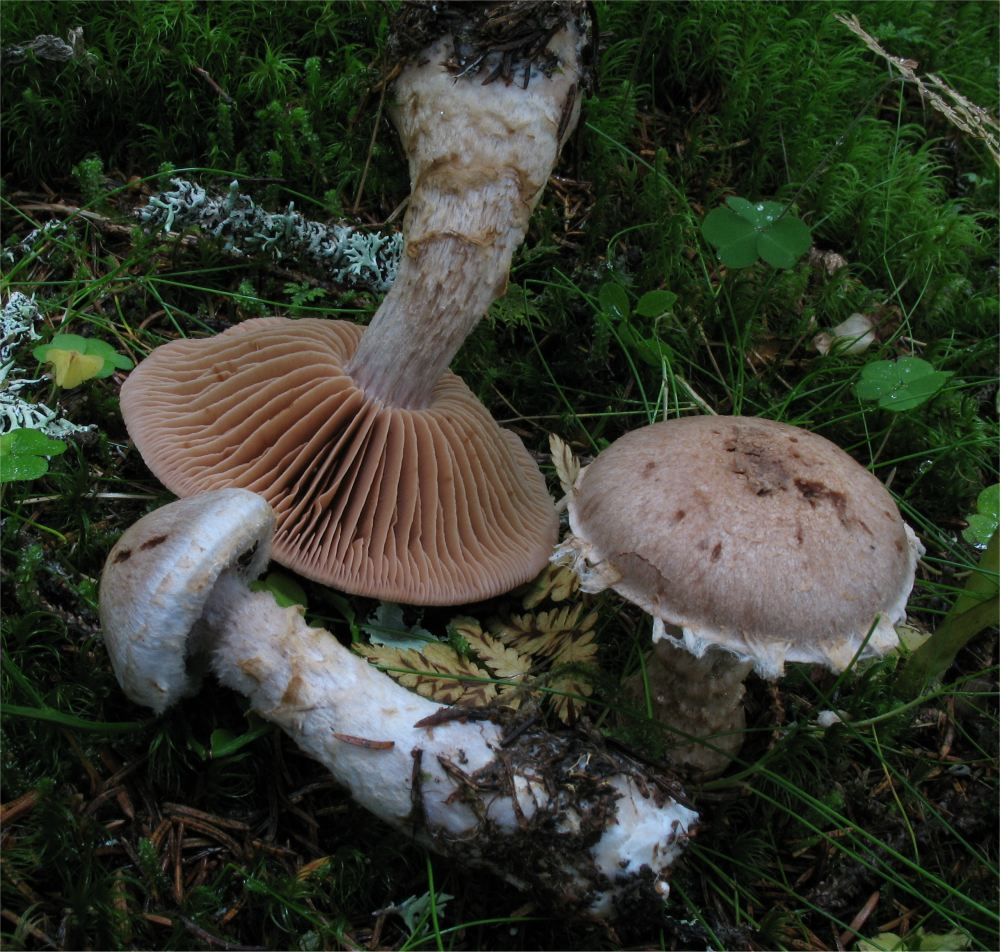
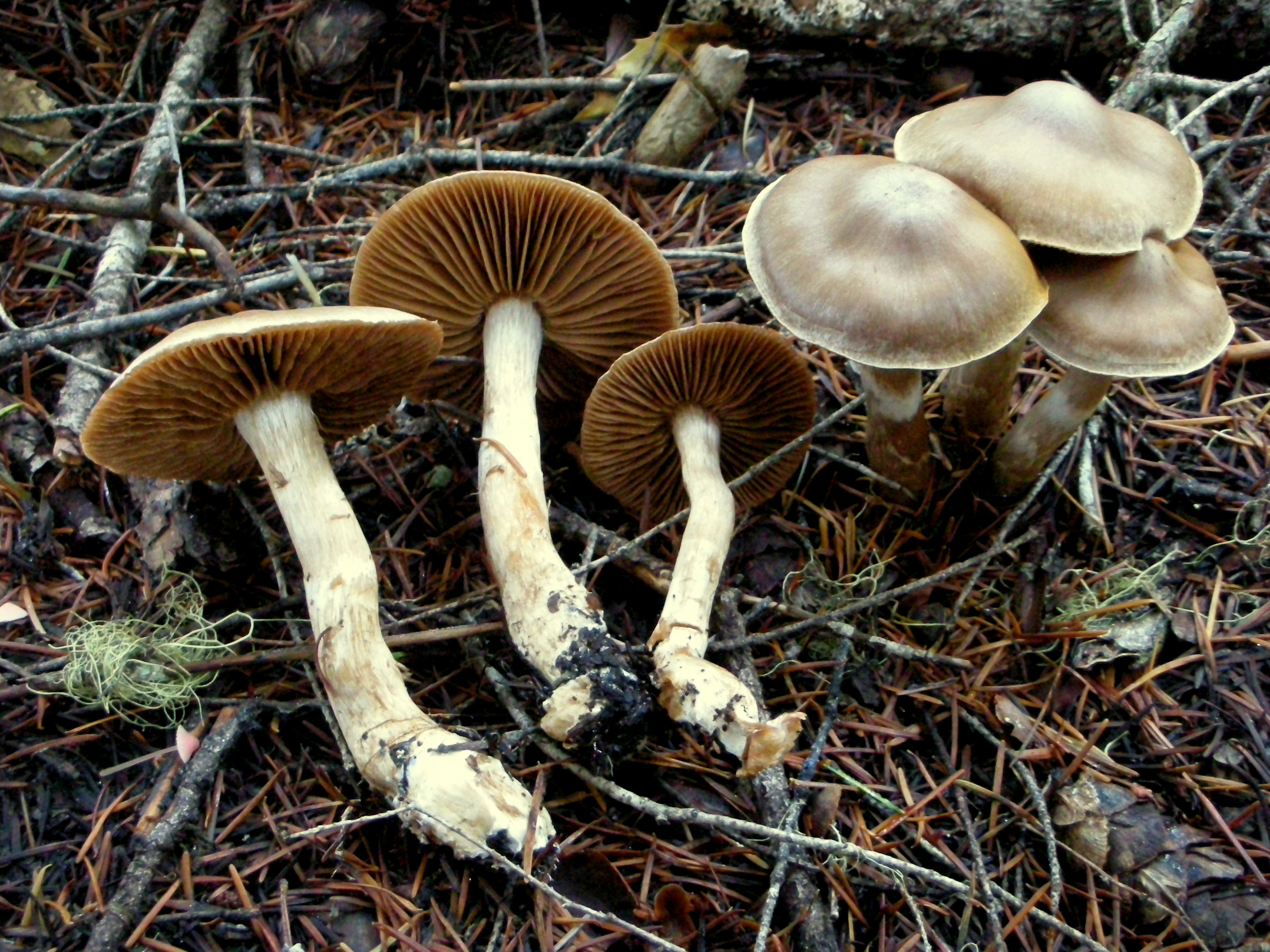
Moser was introduced to the complexities of Cortinarius as a young man. Pictured (clockwise from top right) are some of the species in Cortinarius that were first described by Moser: Cortinarius holojanthinus (Peintner & M.M. Moser 2002), Cortinarius psittacinus (M.M. Moser 1970), Cortinarius betuletorum (M.M. Moser ex M.M. Moser 1967), and Cortinarius canabarba (M.M. Moser 1976).

=== Early life, university, and military service ===
Meinhard Michael Moser was born on 13 March 1924 in Innsbruck, Austria, to Margaretha and Josef Moser. His father was a teacher at a technical college in the city, while his mother was the daughter of the botanist Emil Johann Lambert Heinricher. Moser attended primary school and grammar school in the city. His interest in natural sciences was cultivated from a young age by Heinricher. Moser's earliest paintings of mushrooms date to 1935, when he was 11 years old.

In 1942, Moser enrolled at the University of Innsbruck, taking classes in botany, zoology, geology, physics, and chemistry. Austria was under the control of Nazi Germany at this time, and did not exist as an independent state. Moser became an "authorized mushroom controller and instructor", and was in turn directed to attend mycological seminars around Germany and Austria. At these seminars, he met prominent mycologists, including Ernst Thirring, who introduced Moser to the large genus Cortinarius and its scientific challenges, which remained an interest of Moser's for the rest of his life.

In 1943, aged 19 and after only three terms at Innsbruck, his studies were interrupted by military service. Having shown earlier promise in languages, he was trained as a translator, then sent to the Balkan Peninsula. He continued to have an active interest in mycology, collecting and identifying mushrooms and reading the mycologist Rolf Singer's Das System der Agaricales [The Agaricales in Modern Taxonomy].

In 1945, when Moser was 21 years old and still carrying out active military service, he was captured in Czechoslovakia by Soviet soldiers and made a prisoner of war. He was imprisoned in a labour camp in Crimea. While a prisoner, he was involved in repairing the Institute of Biology of the Southern Seas, Sevastopol. Working in construction at the camp, he had to labour to his physical limits, and was involved in a serious crash that killed several other prisoners. Moser was released in 1948, and chose to return to his studies at the University of Innsbruck. His first publication came in 1949; "Über das Massenauftreten von Formen der Gattung Morchella auf Waldbrandflächen" ["Mass-fruiting of forms of the genus Morchella on forest-fire areas"] was published in the journal Sydowia. In 1950, under the supervision of the botanist Arthur Pisek, Moser completed his doctoral thesis, Zur Wasserökologie der höheren Pilze, mit besonderer Berücksichtigung von Waldbrandflächen [Water Ecology in Higher Fungi with Special Emphasis on Forest-Fire Areas]. During his time at university, he became a member of both the Société mycologique de France and the British Mycological Society. Having become friends with prominent German mycologists during the War, he was keen to re-establish academic relationships throughout Europe in the years following the conflict's resolution.

=== England and the Federal Institute for Forestry Research ===
Due to the quality of his doctoral work, Moser received a grant from the British Council and in 1951 moved to England, where he stayed for six months. While overseas, he performed research in the laboratory of the forest scientist Jack Harley in Oxford, looking into the symbiosis between fungi and forest trees, and spent some time performing taxonomic studies at the Royal Botanic Gardens, Kew. In 1952, after his return to Austria, he was offered a post at the Federal Institute for Forestry Research at Imst, which he accepted. There, he applied what he had learnt about the symbiosis of fungi and trees to the practical issue of reforestation in the Alps, and developed a method for the use of ectomycorrhizal fungi for the "inoculation" of trees, which later became standard practice around the world. Moser remained with the Federal Institute until 1968.

Moser continued his taxonomic studies while at the Federal Institute. In 1953, he published the first edition of Die Blätter- und Bauchpilze (Agaricales und Gastromycetes) [The Gilled and Gasteroid Fungi (Agaricales and Gastromycetes)], a monographic treatment of the Agaricales and Gastromycetes of central Europe. The book listed 3150 taxa. It served as an update to the mycologist Adalbert Ricken's 1918 Vademecum für Pilzfreunde [Handbook for Mushroom Hunters], though reflecting Moser's taxonomic views, which were highly influenced by Singer. The book was part of the series Kleine Kryptogamenflora von Mitteleuropa, edited by the botanist Helmut Gams. The work, which became known simply as "Moser", was updated and republished numerous times over the following decades, and translated into both Italian and English, with the latter being by the naturalist Roger Phillips. Some later versions of the book had a different focus. The mycologist René Pomerleau described a 1967 edition, Röhrlinge und Blätterpilze [Pored and Gilled Mushrooms], containing descriptions of 2547 species, as "probably the most complete and up-to-date descriptive flora of this group of fungi for central Europe". Die Blätter- und Bauchpilze (Agaricales und Gastromycetes) became important for the study of biodiversity in and out of Europe, with Singer calling the book a "much used and appreciated field manual". The work continued to be used as a standard reference for several decades; in 1981, it was still, in the words of the mycologist Richard P. Korf, "the most-used and most authoritative handbook on larger European fleshy fungi".

=== University of Innsbruck ===
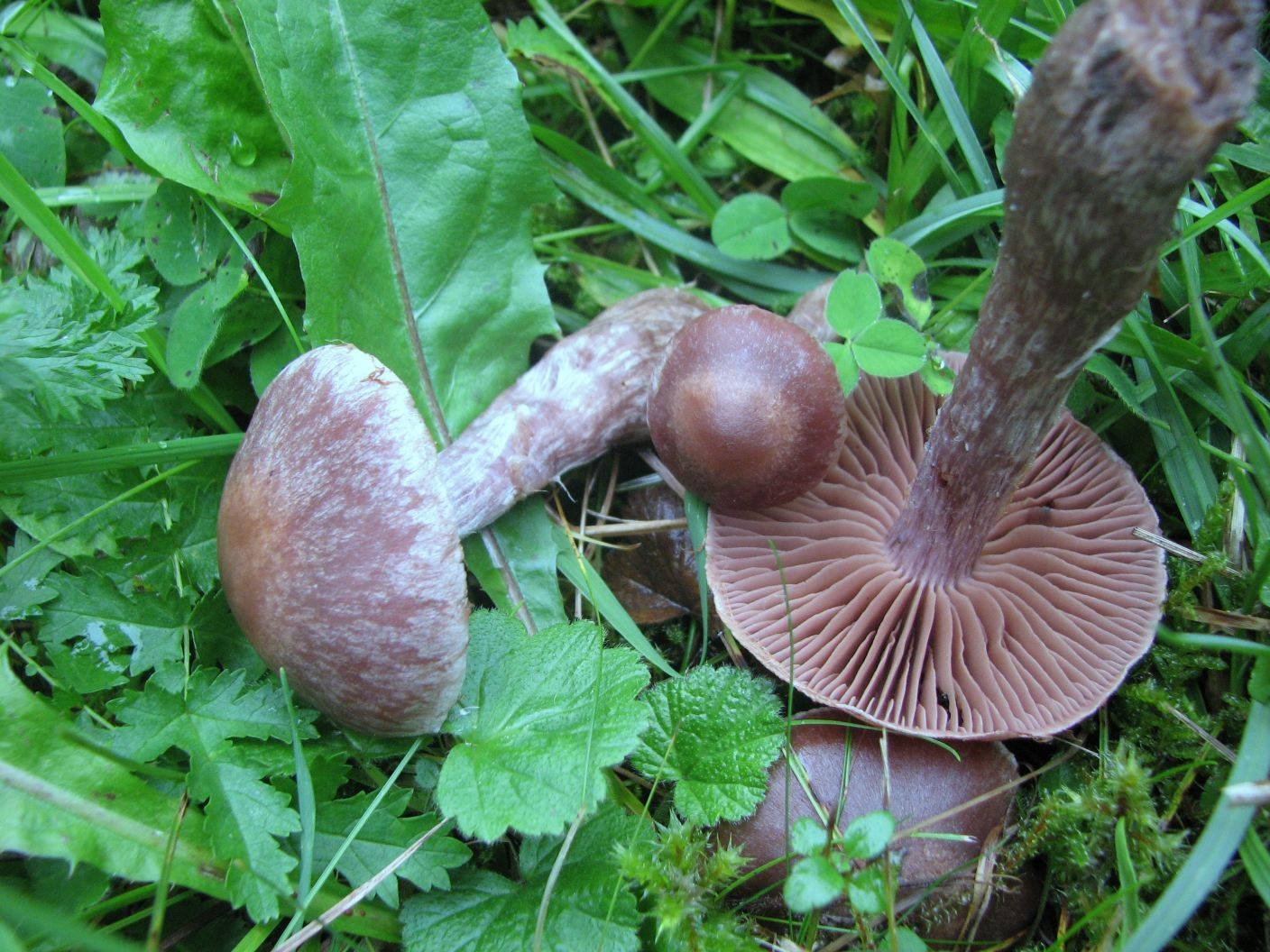
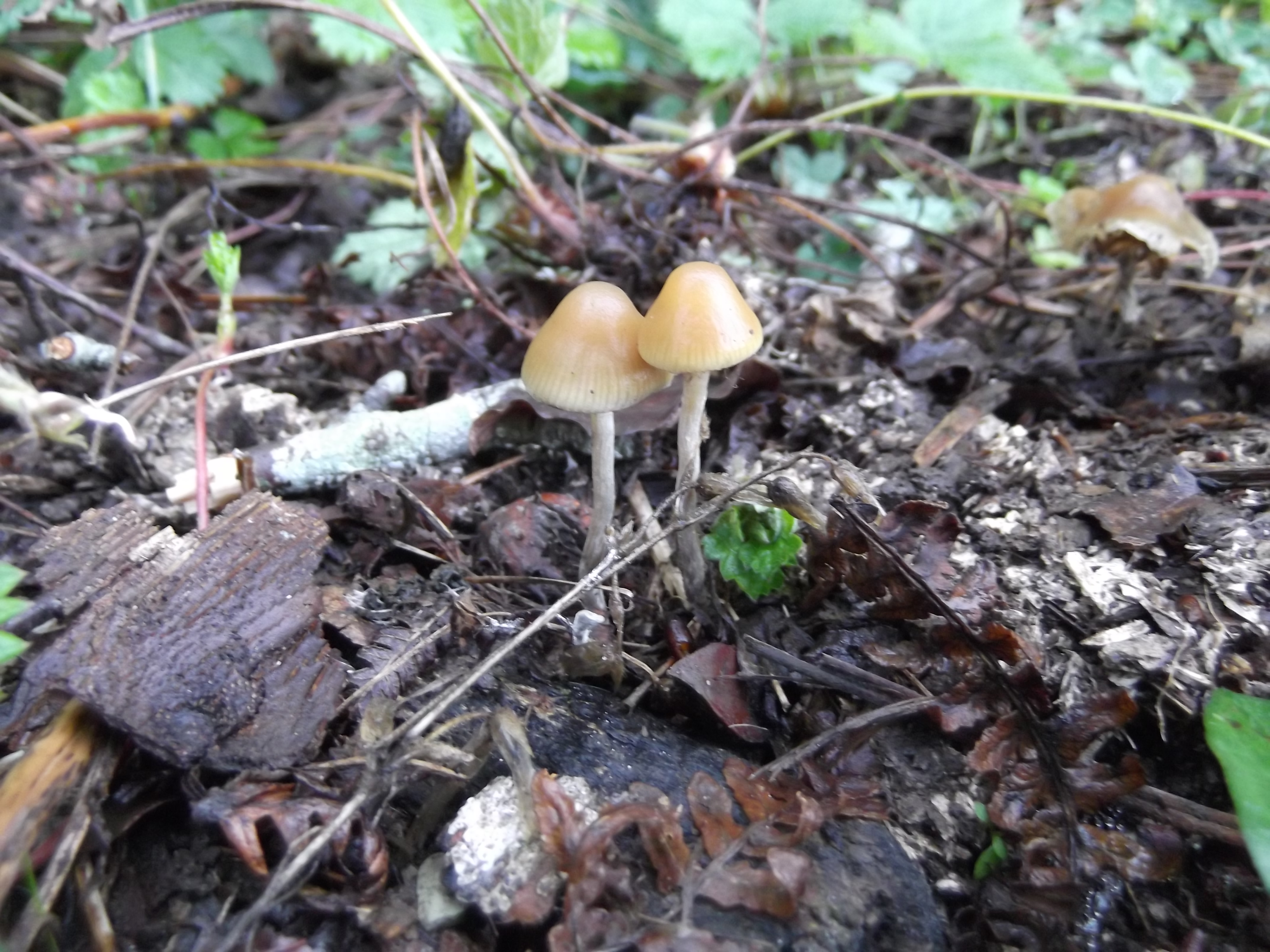
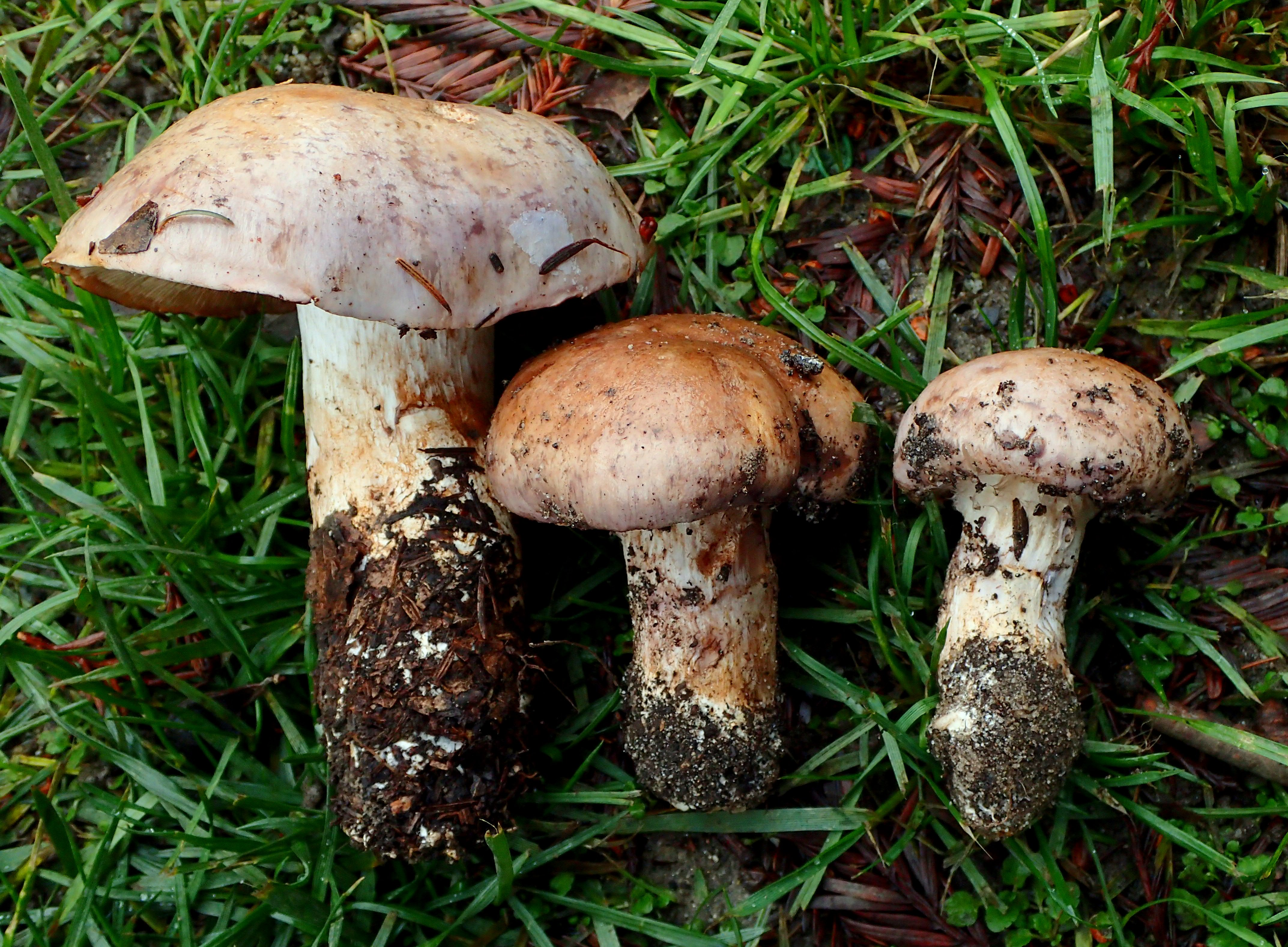
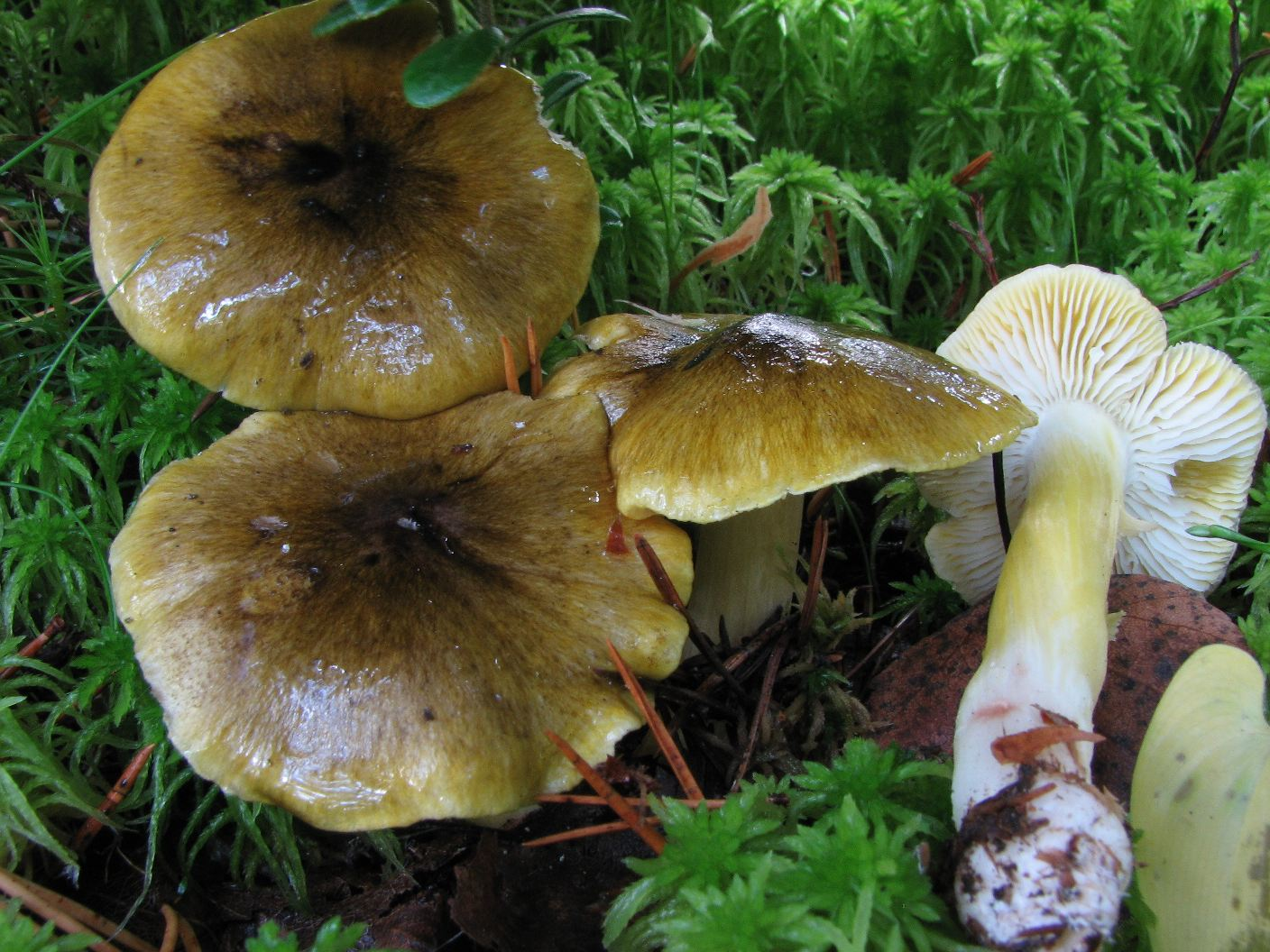
Among the hundreds of taxa first described by Moser, including around 420 species initially assigned to Cortinarius, are (clockwise from top left) Cortinarius serratissimus (M.M. Moser 1968), Psilocybe serbica (M.M. Moser & E. Horak 1969), Tricholoma viridilutescens (M.M. Moser 1978), and Cortinarius lilacinocolossus (M.M. Moser 2000).

In 1956, while still a researcher at the institute, Moser began lecturing on microbiology at the University of Innsbruck, with the title of Privatdozent. He continued to publish while teaching. His monograph Die Gattung Phlegmacium (Schleimköpfe) [The Genus Phlegmacium (Slimeheads)] addressed Phlegmacium, at the time considered a genus but subsequently sometimes considered part of Cortinarius, and was published in 1960 as part of the series Die Pilze Mitteleuropas [The Fungi of Central Europe]. Unlike the previous three books in the series, which were all written by German authors, the work addressed mushrooms that were of less interest to amateur mycologists; for instance, Phlegmacium was not considered to contain any significant edible species. The book drew upon Moser's expertise concerning mycorrhizal relationships. It listed 166 species, including some "exotic" taxa. Some of the listed species were described for the first time in that volume. The illustrations, which came in the form of coloured plates, were mostly Moser's own work; Singer described these in a review of the book as "both in original execution and reproduction among the best that have been published". Discussing the book as a whole, Singer said that the volume, "outstanding for its good print, attractive appearance, and interesting contents, should be present in every mycological library".

In 1963, Moser published a second work in Kleine Kryptogamenflora von Mitteleuropa, Ascomyceten (Schlauchpilze) [Ascomycota (Sac Fungi)]. This work was a monograph on the Ascomycota, focussing on the "Discomycetes". Though not as well known as his earlier book, it was well received in the mycological community. Korf, reviewing the work for Mycologia, said that "the book belongs on the shelf of every mycological library in Europe", praising the "[e]xcellent, workable keys to the orders, families, genera, and European species". Korf wrote that, "[i]f a single fault can be found, it is surely the lack of documentation provided". However, a combination of a lack of time and Moser's comparative lack of expertise in ascomycetes prevented subsequent editions of the work.

Moser was promoted to Associate University Professor in 1964. Two years later, the Faculty of Science of the University of Innsbruck recommended that a chair of microbiology should be created at the Botanical Institute in Innsbruck. The Federal Ministry of Education accepted the recommendation. Moser was the only candidate for the position, and was unanimously named by a number of leading European botanists and mycologists for the post in 1967. Moser was promoted the following year.

The president of the Austrian Mycological Society from 1970, Moser took up the position after the death of the previous post-holder, the mycologist Kurt Lohwag, who had, in turn, taken it up after the death of Thirring earlier that year. Moser remained the society's president for 21 years. In 1972, he became the head of the newly established Institute of Microbiology at Innsbruck, the first of its kind in Austria. He remained in charge of the Institute until his retirement. He taught on a wide range of subjects, including the taxonomy of fungi, ecology of fungi, mycogeography, bacteriology, virology, chemotaxonomy, molecular genetics, microbial toxicology, immunology, and symbiosis. During his career at the university, he supervised over 60 doctoral theses, in addition to diploma theses.

Cortinarius Fr. und nahe verwandte Gattungen in Südamerika [Cortinarius Fr. and Closely Related Genera in South America] was published in 1975. (Note: The work was published as an issue of Nova Hedwigia Beiheft, a supplement to Nova Hedwigia.) Moser coauthored the work with the mycologist Egon Horak, and it was dedicated to Singer. It was a study of South American Cortinarius, Stephanopus – a genus described in this work for the first time – and Dermocybe taxa, containing descriptions of 276 new species. Along with his earlier monograph on Phlegmacium, it proved to be some of Moser's most important work, serving to encourage other mycologists to work on Cortinarius. The mycologist Alexander H. Smith stressed the significance of the work, saying "Anyone who has not worked in the systematics of Cortinarius cannot fully appreciate the magnitude and importance of this work to the general subject of the distribution and speciation of the higher fungi."

In 1983, in recognition of his forthcoming 60th birthday, an article dedicated to Moser was published in Sydowia. The piece, compiled by the microbiologist Franz Schinner, the mycologist Cuno Furrer-Ziogas, and Horak, contained a detailed biography of Moser and a full bibliography of the 116 research publications he had authored or co-authored between 1949 and 1983. Writing with Walter Jülich, Moser published the first volume of the book series Farbatlas der Basidiomyzeten [Colour Atlas of the Basidiomycytes] in 1985, presenting specimens of various Basidiomycota taxa. By the time of Moser's death, 19 volumes had been published; some posthumously published volumes have also listed Moser as an author.

=== Retirement and death ===
In 1991, Moser retired from his teaching position to avoid the administrative burden and to focus on his research into Cortinarius and related genera. After his retirement, he continued to work heavily, typically beginning at 5 am. In 1992, he researched the presence of Agaricales in the Crimean Mountains, identifying approximately 70 species that were not documented (or highly rare) in the region, including some new to science. In 1995 a Festschrift was published in Moser's honour as a supplementary volume of Sydowia. It contained an article on Moser himself, and 16 mycological articles dedicated to him for his 70th birthday.

Moser died on 30 September 2002. He was present at the International Mycological Association's 7th International Mycological Congress, at which he was listed as an author or co-author for four separate presentations. (Note: He was the sole author for "How alpine are 'alpine' fungi?" and "Distribution of Cortinarius in the world flora and their relations to phanerogams. An update". He co-authored "Cortinarius favrei: an example for phylogenetic, morphological, and ecological species concepts in alpine fungi" and "Multiple-gene phylogenies indicate a recent radiation of Cortinarius".) This was held in Oslo, Norway, from 11 to 17 August. After returning home, he suffered a series of heart attacks. He was admitted to hospital, but his condition rapidly declined, resulting in his death. Obituaries were published in a variety of academic journals, including Mycological Progress, Mycological Research, Sydowia, Österreichische Zeitschrift für Pilzkunde, and Berichte des Naturwissenschaftlichen-medizinischen Verein Innsbruck. Horak and colleagues wrote in one that Moser's death meant "an irreplaceable loss to the international community of mycological science", and, in another, that the "mycological world has lost one of its pillars of taxonomy for agarics and boletes. His former students, assistants and collaborators at the Microbiological Institute at the University of Innsbruck, his professional colleagues in the mycological community worldwide and his many friends will deeply regret the loss of a distinguished researcher, teacher, leader and mentor." In a short obituary as part of their report on the Eighth International Symposium on Arctic-Alpine Mycology, the mycologists Cathy Cripps and Joe Ammirati called Moser a "gentlemanly scholar" who "led us in his quiet way across the tundra and down many dichotomous paths".

== Research ==
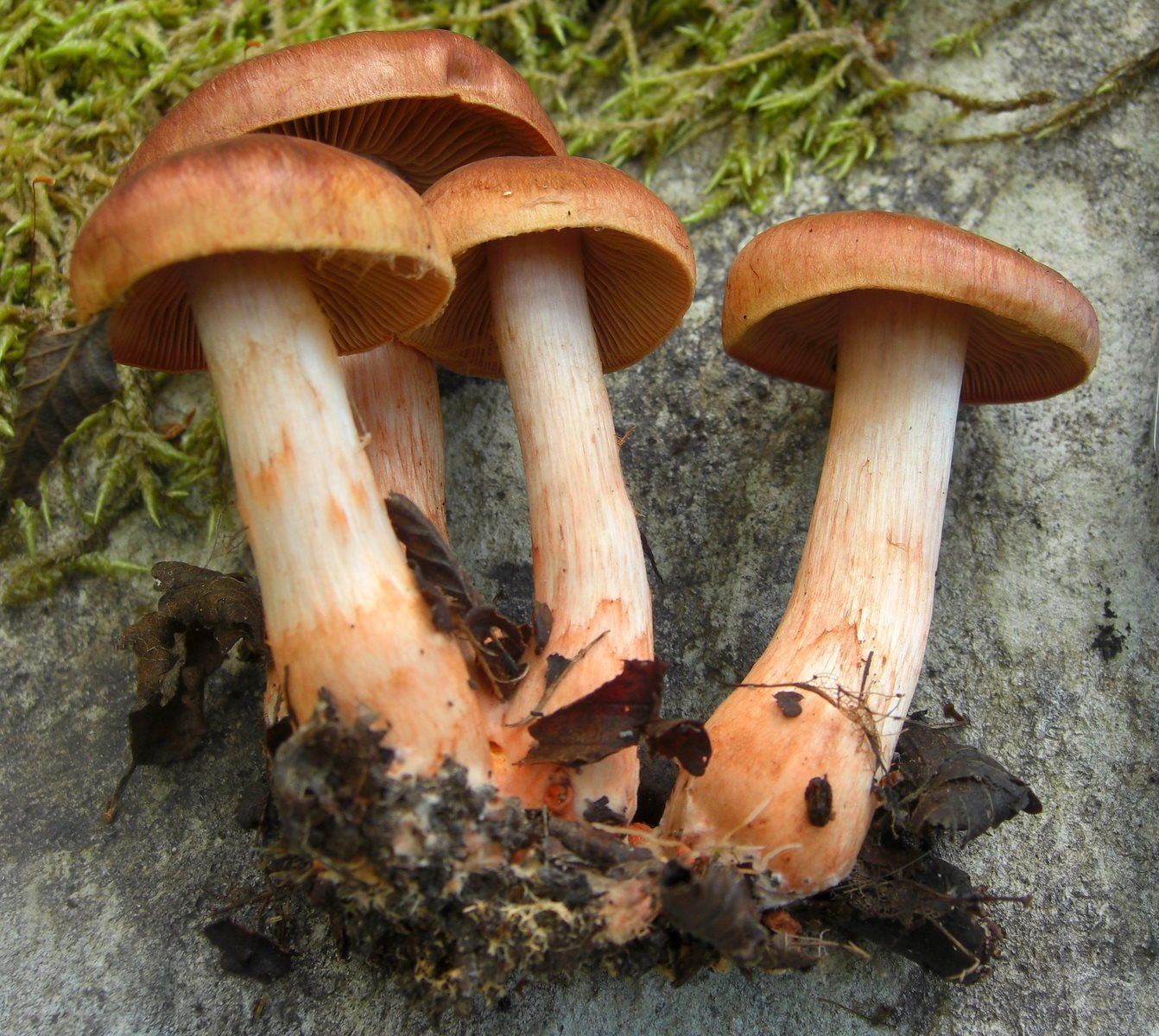
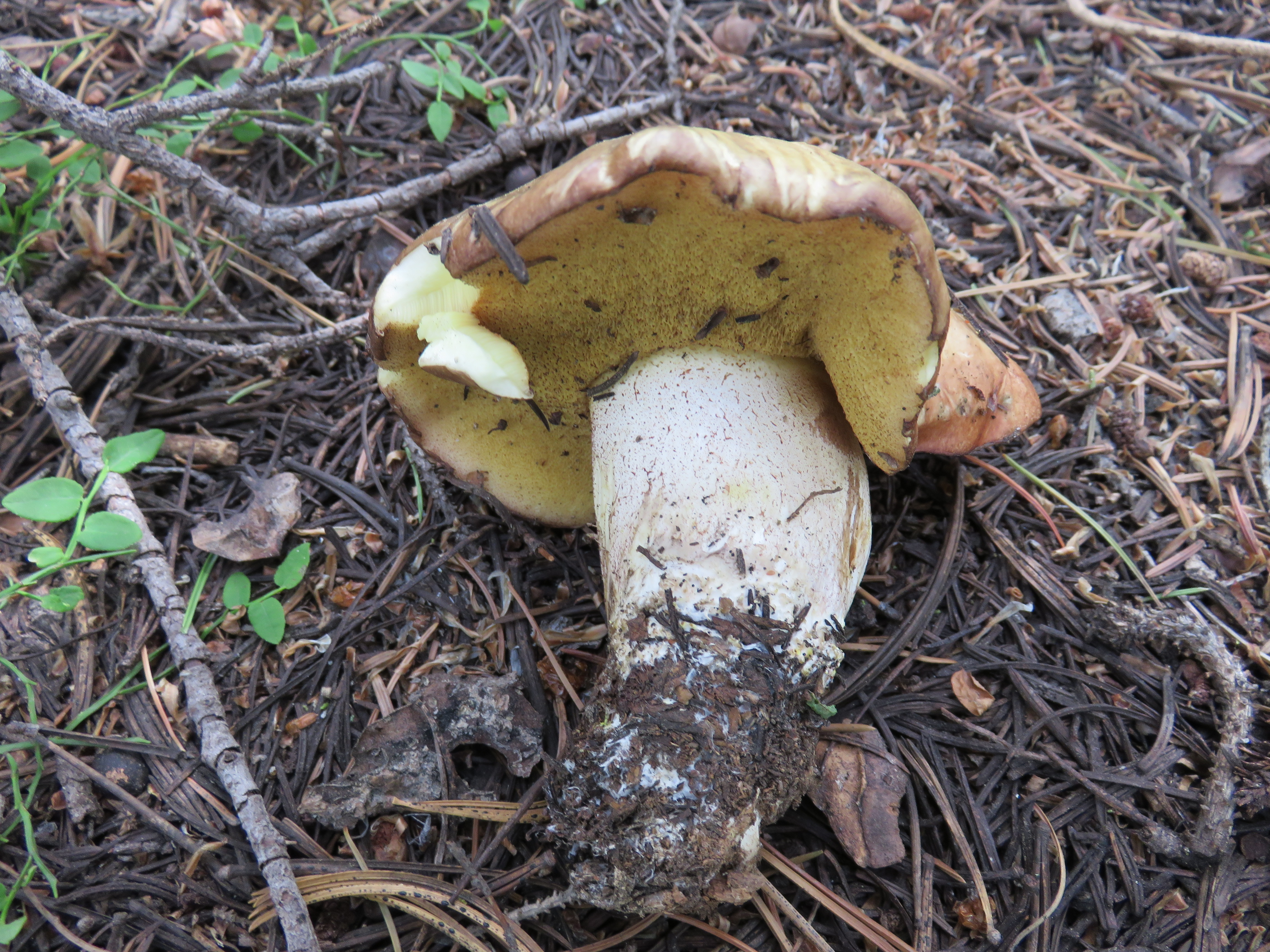
Among the South American species named by Moser and Horak is Cortinarius rubrobasalis (M.M. Moser & E. Horak 1975) (left), while a subalpine species described by Moser is Suillus subalpinus (M.M. Moser 1997) (right).

Over the course of his career, Moser collected more than 25,000 mycological specimens. He first described around 420 Cortinarius species and around 80 other species, including both agarics and boletes. He circumscribed three new genera: Singeromyces (1966), Stephanopus (1975), and Anamika (2002). Much of his research concerned the Agaricales – including the classical morphotaxonomy and the chemotaxonomy of the order, as well as the toxicity of the chemical constituents of the order's members – though a further key research concern was the ecology of ectomycorrhizal symbiosis.

In the early decades of his career, Moser sought to clarify the taxonomic identity of European fungi by collecting specimens to be described as neotypes in the localities studied by the mycologist Elias Magnus Fries, but this was no longer necessary after changes to nomenclatural rules that took effect in 1981. Among the Agaricales, Moser's interest was primarily in the complex genus Cortinarius. He published book-length works addressing Cortinarius taxa found in Europe and, co-writing with Horak, South America. Moser, working with Ammirati, contributed to research on the genus in North America, and also examined Asian and Australasian taxa. He had a particular interest in Arctic–alpine habitats, and he documented, painted and published on his collections in these and other sites around the world. Moser initially doubted the usefulness of molecular phylogenetic analysis of the Agaricales, but later contributed to research in this area.

Cortinarius mushrooms are often highly colourful. Moser made early progress towards studying the pigments in these mushrooms, hoping to find criteria for separating taxa, and some of his doctoral students studied these elements in depth. Cooperating with biochemists, he produced important work on the biosynthesis of pigments. Moser was also interested in the toxicity of the Agaricales, and, with his students, was involved with research on the toxin orellanine.

Moser's work on ectomycorrhizal relationships, though perhaps unknown to many researchers familiar with his taxonomic work, was notable due to its focus on the fungal partners in the relationship. He engaged in a large amount of research on woodland in the transitional zone between subalpine and alpine habitats. His published results included the description of new taxa. In 1960, Singer referred to Moser as "one of the pioneers of mycorrhiza research, both basic and applied".

== Personal life ==
At the end of his life, Moser lived in the village of Vill, a part of Innsbruck. Moser was relatively reserved and formal in public and at events. When among friends and colleagues in relaxed environment he was much more open, displaying wit and a good sense of humour. He had a commitment to both mycological research and mycological education, and was fluent in several languages, such as – in addition to his native German – Russian and Swedish. He was known as an intellectual and a wide reader, with interests in fine art, classical music, literature, exploration, geography, and botany. In addition to reading and walking, he enjoyed stamp collecting and growing plants from seeds he had collected on his research trips. He was a capable cook, often creating mushroom-based dishes for guests, though he was on one occasion poisoned during "gastronomic experiments" involving Phaeolepiota aurea (the golden bootleg) and Agaricus mushrooms. He was also known to make chanterelle schnapps, drinking it with his students and sharing his recipe with colleagues.

== Recognition ==
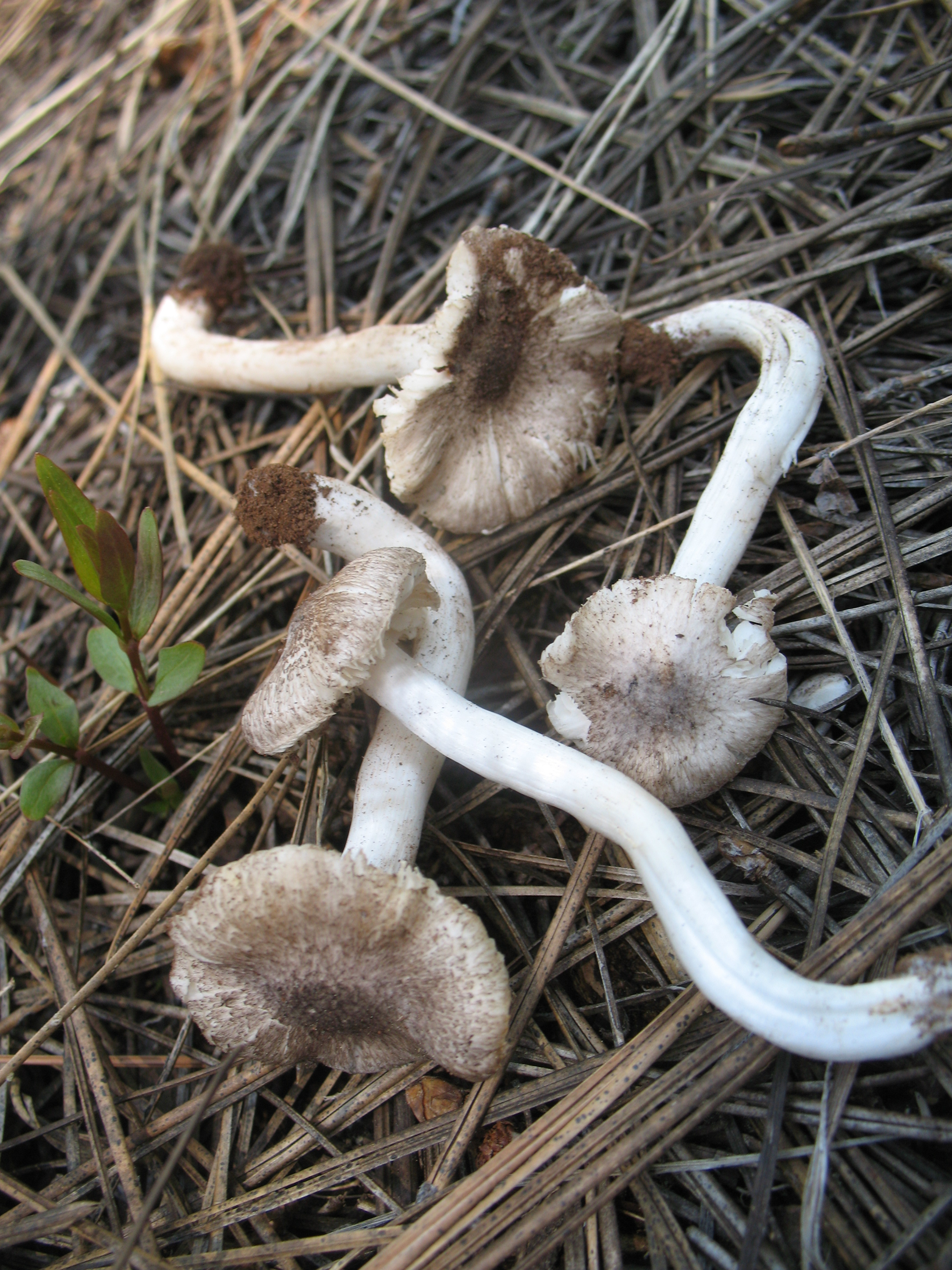
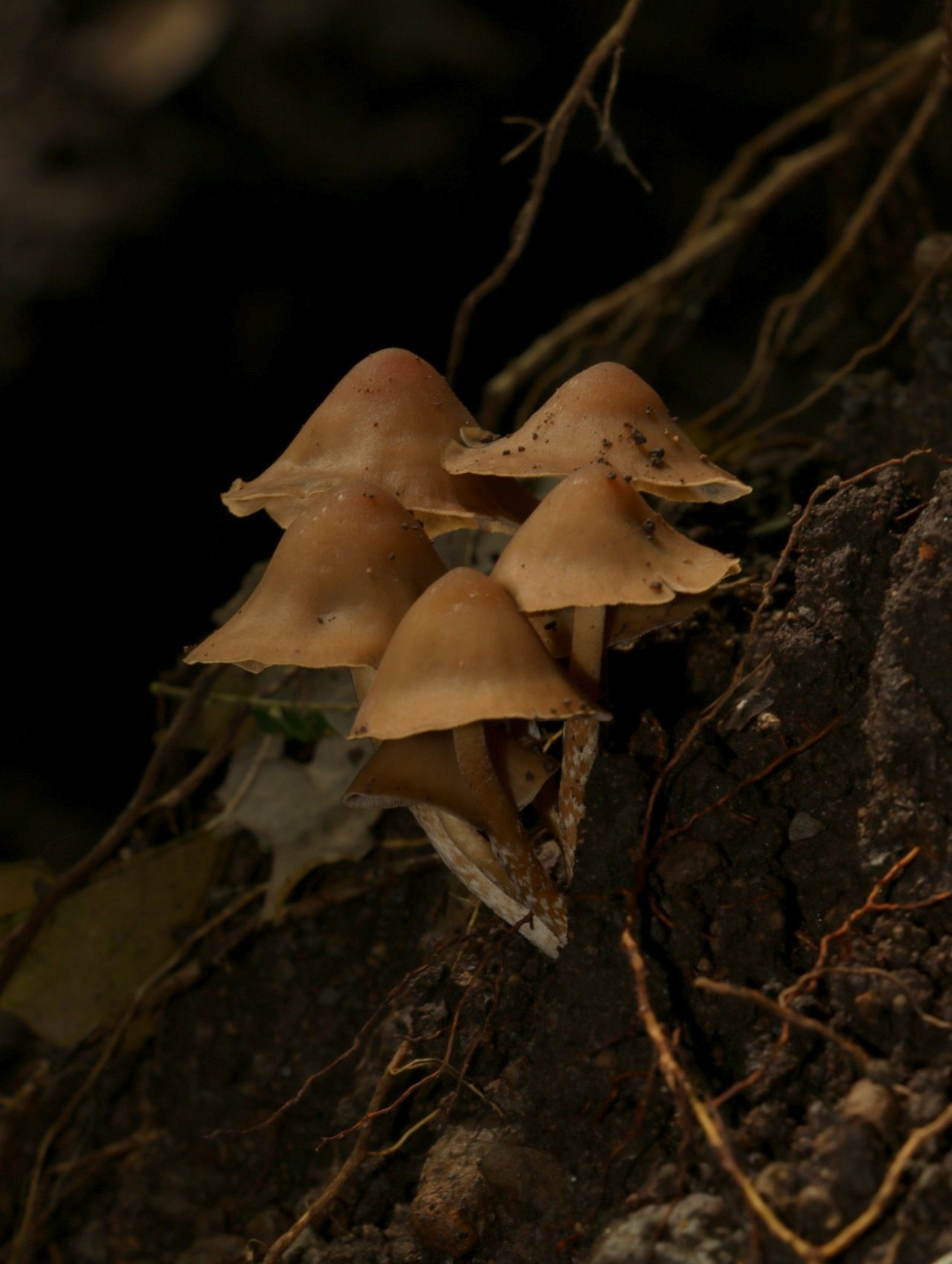
Among the species named in honour of Moser are Tricholoma moseri (Singer 1989) (left) and Psilocybe moseri (Guzmán 1995) (right).

Moser received awards throughout his career, including the Hungarian Mycological Society's Clusius Medal (Budapest, 1978) and the Archdiocese of Vienna's Kardinal-Innitzer-Preis (Vienna, 1985). In 1986, he was made a member of the Austrian Academy of Sciences. Having already been elected as an honorary member of the Ukrainian Botanical Society, he became a foreign member of the Ukrainian Academy of Sciences in 1992, the first mycologist to be elected. He received international recognition from mycological societies, including being made an honorary member of the Mycological Society of America in 1987, and Centenary Fellow of the British Mycological Society in 1996. He also received an honorary doctorate from the University of Lyon in 1984, and in 1990 was awarded honorary citizenship of Borgotaro, Italy.

The genera Moserella (Pöder & Scheuer 1994) and Chromosera (Redhead, Ammirati & Norvell 1995) were named in Moser's honour, as were the species Conocybe moseri (Watling 1980), Cortinarius moseri ((E. Horak) E. Horak 2001), Cortinarius moserianus (Bohus 1970), Cortinarius meinhardii (Bon 1986), Entoloma moserianum (Noordel. 1983), Gerronema moseri (Singer 1983), Gymnopus moseri (Antonín & Noordel. 1997), Hebeloma moseri (Singer 1969), Hydropus moserianus (Bas 1983), Hygrocybe moseri (Bon 1976), Lactarius moseri (Harmaja 1985), Hilberina moseri ((O. Hilber) Huhndorf & A.N. Mill. 2014), Leucoagaricus moseri ((Wasser) Wasser 1978), Peziza moseri (Aviz.-Hersh. & Nemlich 1974), Phaeocollybia moseri (Bandala & Guzmán 1996), Psathyrella moseri (Singer 1969), Psilocybe moseri (Guzmán 1995), Pyxidiophora moseri ((T. Majewski & J. Wisn.) N. Lundq. 1980), Thaxteriola moseri (T. Majewsky & J. Wisn. 1978), Tricholoma moseri (Singer 1989), Tricholoma moserianum (Bon 1990), Tubaria moseri (Raithelh. 1974), and Wardomyces moseri (W. Gams 1995).

== Bibliography ==
A comprehensive bibliography of Moser's work published with a 2003 obituary in Sydowia listed over 210 sole-authored or co-authored publications, with a further eight submitted or in print at time of publication. (Note: The bibliography can be viewed on the website of the University of Innsbruck.) Moser's major works include:

- Moser, Meinhard Michael (1953). Blätter- und Bauchpilze (Agaricales und Gastromycetes). Kleine Kryptogamenflora von Mitteleuropa. Vol. Bd. 2. Stuttgart: Gustav Fischer. pp. 1–282.
- Moser, Meinhard Michael (1955). Blätter- und Bauchpilze. Kleine Kryptogamenflora von Mitteleuropa. Vol. Bd. 2 (2nd ed.). Stuttgart: Gustav Fischer. pp. 1–327.
- Moser, Meinhard Michael (1960). Die Gattung Phlegmacium (Schleimköpfe). Die Pilze Mitteleuropas. Vol. 4. Bad Heilbrunn: Julius Klinkhardt. pp. 1–440.
- Moser, Meinhard Michael (1963). Ascomyceten (Schlauchpilze). Kleine Kryptogamenflora von Mitteleuropa. Vol. Bd. 2a. Stuttgart: Gustav Fischer. pp. 1–147.
- Moser, Meinhard Michael (1967). Röhrlinge und Blätterpilze. Kleine Kryptogamenflora von Mitteleuropa. Vol. Bd. 2b/2 (3rd ed.). Stuttgart: Gustav Fischer. pp. 1–443.
- Moser, Meinhard Michael; Horak, Egon (1975). Cortinarius Fr. und nahe verwandte Gattungen in Südamerika. Nova Hedwigia Beiheft 52: 1–628.
- Moser, Meinhard Michael (1978). Röhrlinge und Blätterpilze. Kleine Kryptogamenflora von Mitteleuropa. Vol. Bd. 2b/2 (4th ed.). Stuttgart: Gustav Fischer. pp. 1–532.
- Moser, Meinhard Michael (1978). Fungorum Rariorum Icones Coloratae. Vol. 7. Vaduz: J. Cramer Verlag. pp. 1–48.
- Moser, Meinhard Michael (1980). Guida alia determinazione dei funghi. (Polyporales, Boletales, Agaricales, Russulales). Trento: Saturnia. pp. 1–565.
- Moser, Meinhard Michael (1983). Röhrlinge und Blätterpilze. Kleine Kryptogamenflora von Mitteleuropa. Vol. Bd. 2b/2 (5th ed.). Stuttgart: Gustav Fischer. pp. 1–533.
- Moser, Meinhard Michael (1983). Keys to Agarics and Boleti (Polyporales, Boletales, Agaricales, Russulales). London: Roger Phillips. pp. 1–535.
- Moser, Meinhard Michael; Jülich, Walter (1985–2002). Farbatlas der Basidiomyzeten. Lieferungen 1–19. Stuttgart: Gustav Fischer. (Note: Further volumes in the series continued to be published after Moser's death, still bearing his name.)
- Moser, Meinhard Michael (1986). Guida alia determinazione dei funghi (Polyporales, Boletales, Agaricales, Russulales) (2nd ed.). Trento: Saturnia. pp. 1–565.
- Moser, Meinhard Michael (2001). Rare, debated and new taxa of the genus Cortinarius (Agaricales). Fungi non Delineati. Vol. 15. Alassio: Libreria Mykoflora. pp. 1–57.
- Keller, Gerwin; Moser, Meinhard Michael (2001). Die Cortinariaceae Österreichs. Catalogus Florae Austriae. Vol. Bd. 3/2. Vienna: Kommission für Interdisziplinäre Ökologische Studien. pp. 1–220.

== See also ==
- Category:Taxa named by Meinhard Michael Moser
