= Singeromyces =

Scientific classification
- Kingdom: Fungi
- Division: Basidiomycota
- Class: Agaricomycetes
- Order: Boletales
- Family: Boletaceae
- Genus: Singeromyces; M.M.Moser

Type species
- Singeromyces ferrugineus M.M.Moser

Genus of fungi

Singeromyces is a fungal genus in the family Boletaceae. It is a monotypic genus, represented by the single species Singeromyces ferrugineus.

The genus was circumscribed by Meinhard Michael Moser in Nova Hedwigia vol.10 on page 331 in 1966.

The genus name of Singeromyces is in honour of Rolf Singer (1906–1994), who was a German-born mycologist and one of the most important taxonomists of gilled mushrooms (agarics) in the 20th century.
