= Margit Babos =

Hungarian mycologist

- Born: October 28, 1931; Budapest, Hungary
- Died: December 27, 2009 (aged 78)
- Scientific career
- Fields: Mycology

Margit Babos (maiden name Margit Greskovits, 1931–2009) was a Hungarian mycologist born on 28 October 1931 in Budapest. She became one of the most widely recognized mycologists in the second half of the 20th century in Eastern Europe, with contributions to mycological research, fungal taxonomy and recording the mycoflora of Hungary.

== Bibliographical data ==
Babos joined the plant herbarium of the Hungarian Natural History Museum in 1951, first as a curator in the paleobotany department, then in the phycology department. In 1954, she joined the Mycology Department under the supervision of Dr. Gábor Bohus. They adopted the modified Herpell exsiccation method which resulted in well-preserved dried specimens of fungi. Although this was a tedious method and often required the process to be started in the field, Babos prepared more than 20,000 Herpell-exsiccata, which forms a valuable part of the fungus collection of the Hungarian National History Museum.

Shortly after joining the Mycology Department, she started participating in ongoing research activities, which mostly focused on recording and cataloguing the mushroom flora of Hungary and the renovation and organization of the Fungal Herbarium. She was promoted as a major museologist of the Hungarian National History Museum.

== Research activities ==
Her research resided around the fungal flora of the continental sand dune systems in Hungary. She performed extensive field work and collecting of fungi in several sites with moving sand dunes, dry sandy grasslands, wet and marshy interdune habitats and dry steppe forests in Hungary. Many of her research sites belonged to the Kiskunság National Park or the Hortobágy National Park and the knowledge gathered still forms the basis of our understanding of the European continental sand dune mycoflora. She made extensive comparisons with coastal, halophilic sand dunes and was always delighted by the high species overlap between these habitats despite great geography distances. She has reported the occurrence in Hungary many of the species described from coastal sand dunes in France and Spain, most of which were new for the Hungarian mycoflora.

While recording fungi from sandy habitats, she became a specialist of several groups of fungi. She was an internationally renown expert of Lepiota s.l. Inocybe Pluteus but has made important contributions to several other groups of fungi as well, such as Bolbitius, Rhodocybe, Coprinus, Tricholosporum, and Leucopaxillus. Babos collected the type materials of several Cortinarius and Agaricus species, which she described together with Gábor Bohus. She worked with several major figures of mycology of the time, including Albert Pilát, Marcel Bon, and Johann Stangl.

During her taxonomic work, she described 12 new taxa:

- Collybia distorta var. amara Babos 1983.
- Coprinus micaceus var. mammosus Babos 1976.
- Inocybe aeruginascens Babos in Bohus 1970.
- Inocybe javorkae Babos & Stangl 1985.
- Leucoagaricus brunneolilacinus Babos 1980.
- Leucocoprinus pilatianus var. erubescens Babos 1979.
- Macrolepiota excoriata f. barlae Babos 1974.
- Pluteus nigroviridis Babos 1983.
- Pluteus variabilicolor Babos 1978.
- Rhodocybe popinalis var. hollosii Babos in Babos et al. 1994.
- Tricholoma eosinobasis Babos, Bohus & Vasas 1991.
- Tricholoma nodulosporum Babos & Bohus in Bohus 1983.

She has also made numerous new taxonomic combinations in Lepiota, Rhodocybe, Tricholoma, and others. As a commemoration of her scientific achievements, three species of fungi have been named in her honour:

- Agaricus babosiae Bohus 1990, Ann. Hist.-Nat. Mus. Natn. Hung. 81: 37.
- Leucoagaricus babosiae Bon 1993, Doc. Mycol. 22(88): 31.
- Coprinopsis babosiae L. Nagy, Vagvolgyi & Papp 2013

In addition to sand dunes, she performed extensive research in the fungi growing on sawdust and wood-chips piles, a special habitat with unique fungal associations. She reported over 100 species from sawdust and described three new species, Pluteus variabilicolor, P. nigroviridis and Collybia distorta var. amara. She was also interested in the fungi occurring in floating bogs. In collaboration with Gábor Bohus, they contributed significantly to the clarification of the taxonomy of Agaricus mushrooms in Europe. In this genus belong one of the most widely produced mushroom, Agaricus bisporus, the button mushroom. They also performed extensive experiments on establishing cultivation protocols for additional Agaricus species, such as Agaricus macrosporus and A. macrosporoides. She has also investigated Diptera (flies) living in mushroom fruit bodies and determined the specificity and distribution of Diptera species in various fungal species.

== Major publications ==
Margit Babos published 115 research papers and popular articles between 1958 and 2004. Her most monumental works include the Catalogue of Hungarian Macrofungi (Agaricales s.l.) in 1989 which summarized the state of the art knowledge on the occurrence and distributions of macroscopic mushrooms of the broadly understood order Agaricales. It is based on the macrofungi collections of the Hungarian Natural History Museum, which has been re-established, catalogued and organized after World War II by Margit Babos and Gábor Bohus. In addition, she published two volumes on the macrofungi of the Kiskunság and the Hortobágy National Parks which give the foundation of the mycological knowledge on continental sandy areas.

On the international stage, her best-known works are those on the taxonomy of Lepiota s.l. fungi and the genus Inocybe. Together with Gábor Bohus, she published a volume of Fungorum rariorum icones coloratae, Pars VIII in 1977. Babos published several books and identification guides and gave hundreds of lectures and seminars on fungal biology in Hungarian.

== Awards and distinctions ==
Her contributions to Hungarian and European mycology have been recognized by several awards. She has received the Clusius Medallion of the Hungarian Mycological Society twice, in 1974 and 2009. She has been awarded a Budapest Medallion during the 12th Cortinarius Congress (1994), the Laszlo Szemere Medallion of the First Hungarian Truffle Society (2004). She has been granted knighthood by the "Szent Laszlo Truffle Order" on 10 September 2005. In 2008 the journal "Magyar Gombasz" (Hungarian Mycology) recognized her oeuvre by an award (oeuvre-award). Her last honour, the Effectrix Magnus Collectiones Award of the Hungarian National History Museum was awarded to her in 2009, one month before her death, on 27 December. In 2010 a foray was held in Kiskunság National Park in her honour, where almost 70 species of macrofungi were identified.

== Cited literature ==
- Vasas G. (2010). "In memoriam Margit Babos (1931–2009)" (PDF). Studia Botanica Hungarica. 41: 5–19.
- Vasas G. (2011). "Babos Margit (1931–2009) Mikológiai Munkássága" (PDF). Clusiana. 50 (1): 11–22.
- Lukács Z, Czakó K, Molnár L, Molnár Á (2011). "Babos Margit-Emlékséta Bugacon, A Kiskunsági Nemzeti Parkban" (PDF). Clusiana. 50 (1): 45–8.
