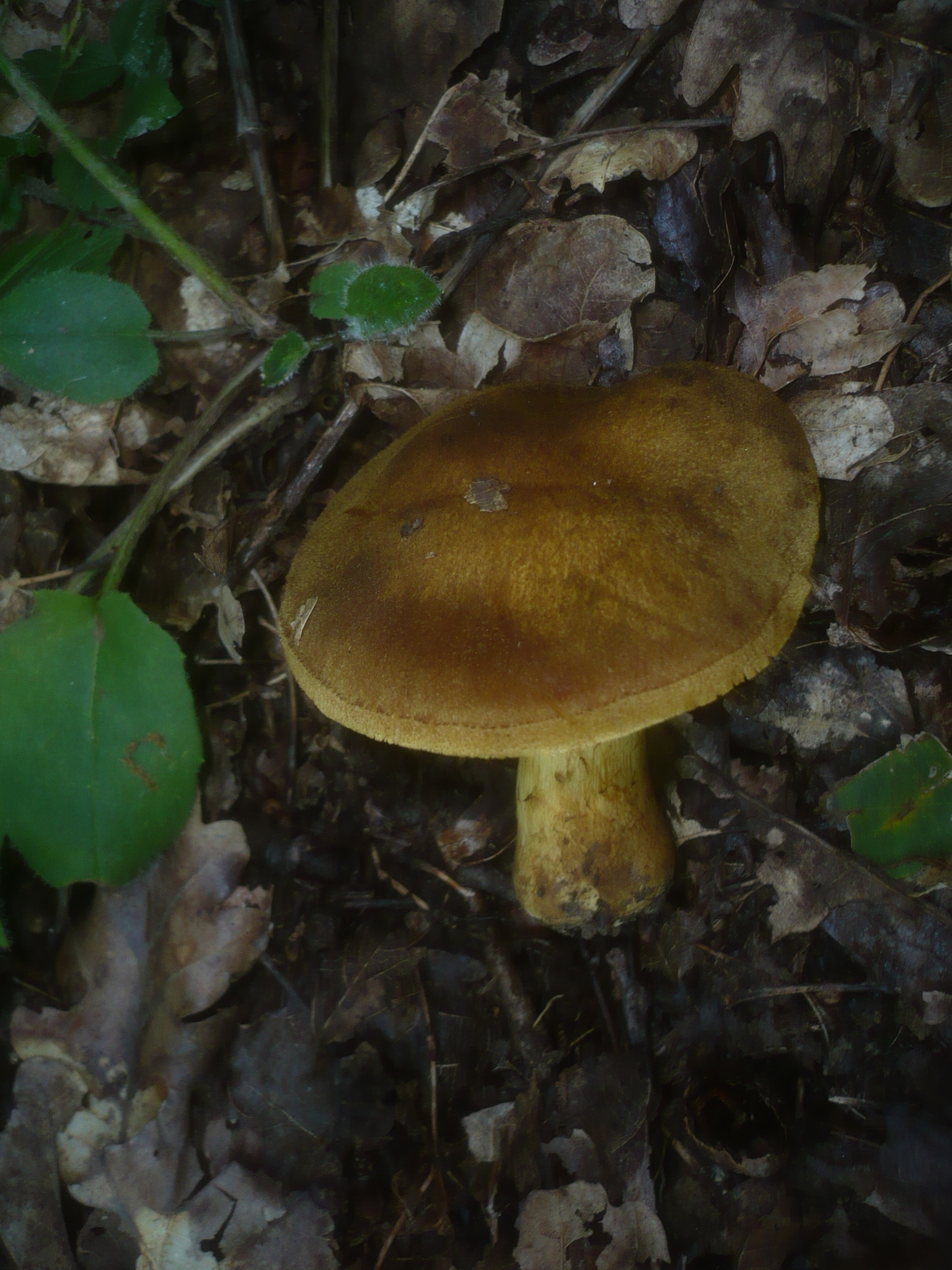

Scientific classification
- Domain: Eukaryota
- Kingdom: Fungi
- Division: Basidiomycota
- Class: Agaricomycetes
- Order: Agaricales
- Family: Cortinariaceae
- Genus: Cortinarius
- Species: C. psittacinus

Binomial name
- Cortinarius psittacinus M.M. Moser

= Cortinarius psittacinus =

Species of fungus

Cortinarius psittacinus is a fungus in the genus Cortinarius native to Belgium. It was described by Austrian mycologist Meinhard Michael Moser in 1970.
