= Hebeloma ammophilum =

Scientific classification
- Domain: Eukaryota
- Kingdom: Fungi
- Division: Basidiomycota
- Class: Agaricomycetes
- Order: Agaricales
- Family: Hymenogastraceae
- Genus: Hebeloma
- Species: H. ammophilum

Binomial name
- Hebeloma ammophilum Bohus (1978)

Species of fungus

Hebeloma ammophilum is a species of mushroom in the family Hymenogastraceae. It was described as new to science in 1978 by the Hungarian mycologist Gábor Bohus.

== See also ==
- List of Hebeloma species
