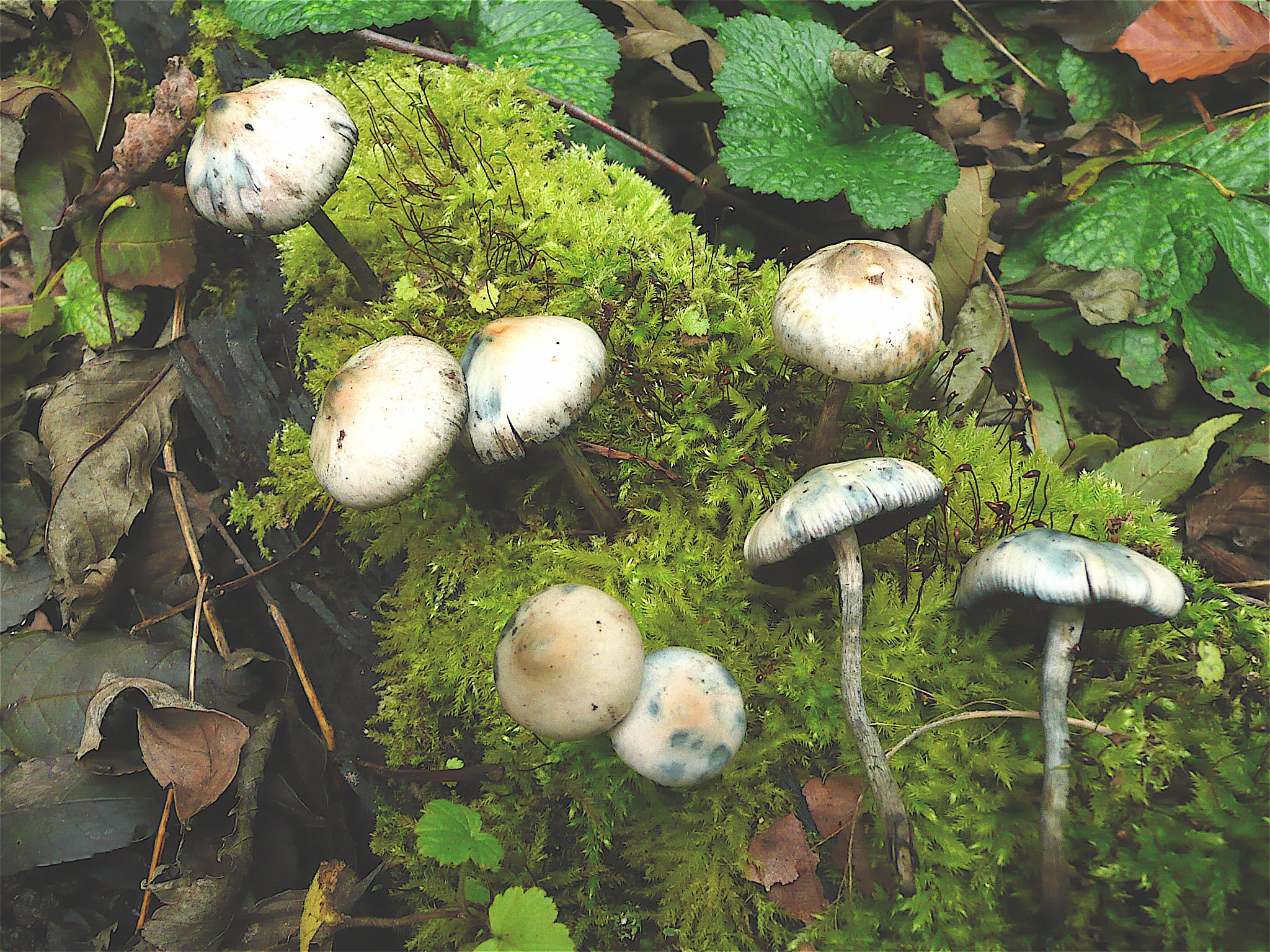
- Psilocybe serbica var. arcana

Scientific classification
- Kingdom: Fungi
- Division: Basidiomycota
- Class: Agaricomycetes
- Order: Agaricales
- Family: Hymenogastraceae
- Genus: Psilocybe
- Species: P. serbica

Binomial name
- Psilocybe serbica M.M.Moser & E.Horak (1969)

Synonyms
- Psilocybe bohemica Šebek (1983); Psilocybe arcana Borov. & Hlavácek (2001); Psilocybe moravica Borov. (2003)

= Psilocybe serbica =

Species of fungus

Psilocybe serbica
- Mycological characteristics
- Gills on hymenium
- Cap is convex or conical
- Hymenium is adnate or adnexed
- Stipe has a cortina
- Spore print is blackish-brown to purple
- Ecology is saprotrophic
- Edibility is psychoactive

Psilocybe serbica is a species of mushroom in the family Hymenogastraceae. The mushroom contains the psychotropic compounds psilocybin and psilocin, and also related tryptamine alkaloids baeocystin, norbaeocystin, and aeruginascin. It is closely related to Psilocybe aztecorum. It was reported as new to science by Meinhard Moser and Egon Horak in 1969. Molecular analysis published in 2010 has shown that P. serbica is the same species as Psilocybe bohemica described by Šebek in 1983, Psilocybe arcana described by Borovička and Hlaváček in 2001, and Psilocybe moravica by Borovička in 2003. Psilocybe serbica is common in Central Europe.

== Description ==
Psilocybe serbica has no specific smell (somewhat raddish, but never farinaceous), and the taste is usually bitter. It is a very variable species.
Its cap is 1–4 cm (0.4–1.6 in) in diameter and obtusely conical, later becoming campanulate or convex. It expands to broadly convex or plane in age and is incurved at first then plane or decurved with age. The cap is buff-brown to dingy orangish-brown and pale ochraceous when dry. It is smooth, hygrophanous, and slightly translucent-striate when moist but not viscid and without a separable gelatinous pellicle. The flesh is whitish to cream-colored, bruising blue when injured.
Spores are purple-brown, ellipsoid, slightly flattened, and thick-walled, with a distinct germ pore. The size is very variable, mostly 10–13 × 6–7.5 μm, but also much longer.
The gills are adnate to adnexed and close, often distinctly subdecurrent. They are initially light brown, becoming dark brown with age with a purple tint, the edges remaining paler.
The stipe is 45–80 mm (1.8–3.1 in) long, and 2–10 mm (0.1–0.4 in) thick. It has an equal structure, slightly enlarging at the base. It is whitish with a silky gloss and glabrous, or with some whitish remnants of the fibrillose veil.

Pleurocystidia are present and frequent; cheilocystidia often arise from hyphae parallel to the edge of the lamella.

== Habitat ==
Psilocybe serbica is found growing mostly in groups, on well decayed deciduous and coniferous wood, and along Urtica spp. or Rubus spp. on twigs, compost, plant residue in forests, usually in moist places along creeks, forest paths, and roadside verges. It is not reported to be synanthropic as Psilocybe cyanescens but rarely it may occur also on woodchips.

== Alkaloid content ==
In Psilocybe serbica var. arcana, concentrations of psilocin and psilocybin were in the range of 0.412–7.922 mg/g and 0.002–8.878 mg/g (dry weight), respectively. The concentrations of psilocin (0.027–2.485 mg/g) and psilocybin (1.553–15.543 mg/g) determined in var. bohemica were found significantly higher. In this study, the concentration of 15.543 mg/g psilocybin in var. bohemica was the highest determined in the whole dataset and P. serbica is therefore comparable with the highly potent P. azurescens with psilocybin concentrations reported of up to 17.8 mg/g.

== See also ==
- Psilocybe germanica
- List of Psilocybin mushrooms
- Psilocybin mushrooms
