= Hydropus moserianus =

Scientific classification
- Kingdom: Fungi
- Division: Basidiomycota
- Class: Agaricomycetes
- Order: Agaricales
- Family: Marasmiaceae
- Genus: Hydropus
- Species: H. moserianus

Binomial name
- Hydropus moserianus Bas (1983)

Species of mushroom-forming fungus

Hydropus moserianus is a species of agaric fungus in the family Marasmiaceae, first described in 1983 from collections in the Netherlands, and since recorded from Belgium. It is a small ground-dwelling fungus with a dark greyish-brown cap and widely spaced gills that run down its thin stipe. Unlike many related species that grow on wood, this fungus is found in terrestrial habitats including coastal dunes and forest soils.

== Taxonomy ==
Hydropus moserianus was formally described as a new species by Cornelis Bas in 1983, based on several collections made in the Netherlands. The specific epithet honours the mycologist Meinhard Moser.

The species belongs to the genus Hydropus within the family Marasmiaceae. Singer's 1982 classification places it in section Hydropus, subsection Marginelli, defined by species that possess pileocystidia (specialised cells on the cap surface), amyloid spores (spores that stain blue in iodine), and fruit bodies that do not blacken upon maturity.

Within this subsection, H. moserianus is characterised by several distinctive features: the presence of both pleurocystidia and partially beak-shaped hymenial cystidia, distant to very distant gills that descend down the stem, predominantly four-spored basidia, and dark brown colouration combined with a terrestrial habitat.

The species was initially thought to represent an undescribed European occurrence of the North American Hydropus arenarius, described by Alexander H. Smith in 1947 as Mycena arenaria and transferred to Hydropus by Rolf Singer in 1951. However, examination of type material revealed significant differences, including spore dimensions, cystidial morphology, and pigmentation patterns, necessitating the recognition of H. moserianus as a distinct species.

== Description ==
Hydropus moserianus produces a small to medium‑sized fungus with an omphalinoid basidiocarp. The cap measures 4–18 mm in diameter and up to 7 mm in height. Initially paraboloid to conical or hemispherical, it becomes convex to flattened or centrally depressed with age. The cap is hygrophanous—changing colour as it loses moisture—and appears fuliginous (sooty) to dark grey‑brown when wet. Short translucent striations appear at the margin in moist conditions; upon drying, the surface turns pale grey‑brown or sepia‑tinged buff with a dry, matt to minutely granular texture.

The gills are widely spaced and decurrent—running down the stem—and vary from narrow and arched to broadly triangular. They are moderately thick and interconnected by veins, ranging from pale grey to dark grey‑brown, with even or faintly fringed edges under magnification. The stem measures 14–26 mm long by 0.3–1.5 mm wide, is cylindrical or slightly flattened, and shifts from white to ivory at the apex to greyish or dark grey‑brown towards the base. Though appearing smooth to the naked eye, a fine pruinose (powdery) covering is evident under high magnification.

The flesh is whitish to pale grey and remains unchanged when bruised; very fresh specimens may exude water droplets from the stem when cut. Odour and taste are indistinct. Microscopically, spores measure 8–11 by 4–5.5 μm, are flattened on one side and elongated‑ellipsoidal with slightly tapered, bent bases, and show a pronounced amyloid reaction (blue staining in Melzer's reagent). Basidia are predominantly four‑spored, with occasional two‑spored forms.

Two types of cystidium occur on the gill edge: narrowly to broadly club‑shaped cells and flask‑shaped cells bearing necks up to 45 μm long. Similar cystidia, though less abundant, line the gill faces. The cap surface is a cutis of brown hyphae with varied projecting cells, while the stem surface bears numerous thin‑walled, colourless cystidia, mostly flask‑shaped with long, narrow necks.

== Habitat and distribution ==
Hydropus moserianus is known from the Netherlands, where it has been documented in three provinces (Drenthe, North Holland, and North Brabant) across notably diverse habitats. These include the loamy bank of a ditch in broad-leaved forest, patches of Salix repens (creeping willow) in coastal sand dune valleys, and amongst Polytrichum moss on recently burned sandy soil. The species appears to prefer terrestrial habitats rather than the wood-inhabiting tendency of many related mushrooms. This ground-dwelling nature distinguishes it from close relatives like H. marginellus, which typically grows gregariously on decaying wood.

At the time of its original publication, H. moserianus had only been reported from the Netherlands, making it a potentially rare European endemic. It was later reported from Flanders in an alder forest.
