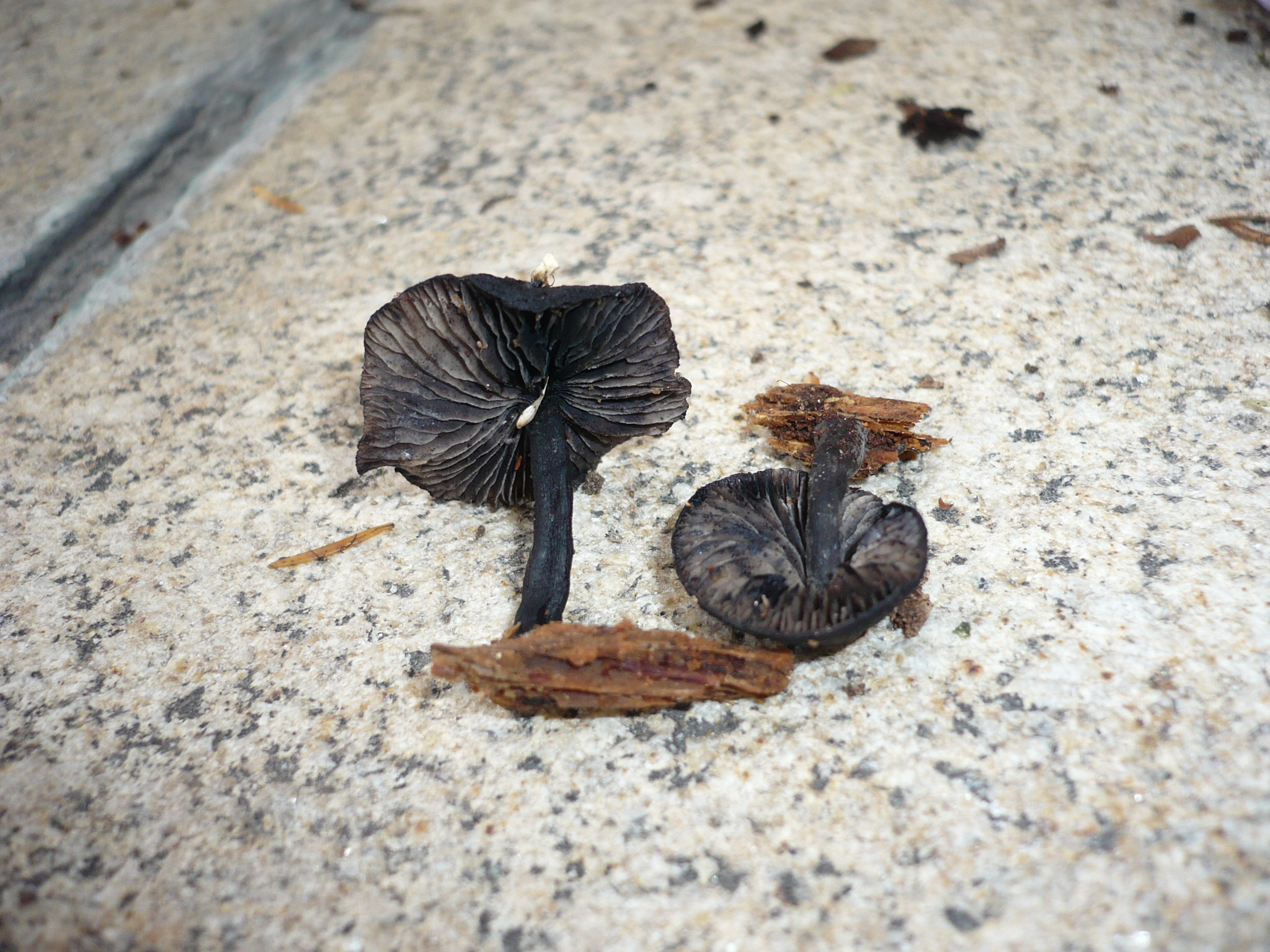
- Hydropus atramentosus

Scientific classification
- Kingdom: Fungi
- Division: Basidiomycota
- Class: Agaricomycetes
- Order: Agaricales
- Family: Marasmiaceae
- Genus: Hydropus; Kühner ex Singer (1948)

Type species
- Hydropus fuliginarius (Batsch) Singer (1943)

= Hydropus =

Genus of fungi

Hydropus is a genus of fungi in the family Porotheleaceae. The widespread genus contains about 100 species, especially in tropical areas, but is not well represented in temperate regions. About 15 taxa are found in Europe; H. floccipus has the widest distribution in western Europe. Hydropus was circumscribed by Rolf Singer in 1948. Species in the genus have fruit bodies with caps that are mycenoid, collybioid, or omphaloid in form. Most species occur in tropical and subtropical regions, where they grow as saprobes on rotting wood, forest litter, and mosses. Generally, most Hydropus species are rare, and several are known only from the type collection, including H. conicus, H. moserianus, H. nitens, and H. paradoxus.

== Selected species ==
- Hydropus anthidepas
- Hydropus atramentosus
- Hydropus aurarius
- Hydropus conicus
- Hydropus floccipes
- Hydropus funebris
- Hydropus griseolazulinus
- Hydropus kauffmanii
- Hydropus liciosae
- Hydropus marginellus
- Hydropus moserianus
- Hydropus nitens
- Hydropus paradoxus
- Hydropus praedecurrens
- Hydropus serifluus
- Hydropus sphaerosporus
- Hydropus subalpinus
- Hydropus taxodii
- Hydropus trichoderma

== See also ==
- List of Marasmiaceae genera
