= Geasteroides =

Scientific classification
- Kingdom: Fungi
- Division: Basidiomycota
- Class: Agaricomycetes
- Order: Geastrales
- Family: Geastraceae
- Genus: Geasteroides; Long (1917)

Type species
- Geasteroides texensis Long (1917)

Synonyms
- Geasteropsis texensis (Long) E.Fisch. (1933); Terrostella texensis (Long) Long (1945)

Genus of fungi

Geasteroides is a fungal genus in the family Geastraceae. A monotypic genus, it contains the single species Geasteroides texensis, described by American mycologist William Henry Long in 1917.

== Taxonomy ==
Long described both the new genus and species in a 1917 article in the journal Mycologia. The type collection was made in Denton, Texas in October 1907. Long called it "a Calvatia among the geaster". In 1945, Long replaced the name with Terrostella, suggesting that Geasteroides was illegitimate because it had been used by Giovanni Antonio Battarra in 1755. However, later changes in the nomenclatural rules meant that names of gasteroid species published before 1801 no longer had priority, rendering Terrostella illegitimate. Patricio Ponce de León transferred the Congolese species Geastrum barbatum (described by Dissing & M. Lange in 1962) to Geasteroides in 1968, but this has since been transferred to the genus Phialastrum.

== Description ==
Geasteroides texensis has a fruit body that splits open in maturity in a star-like fashion to reveal a spherical inner spore sac (gleba). The ochre to whitish outer layer of skin, the exoperidium, is thick and leathery and often has a thin layer of adhering cobweb-like mycelium and debris that peels away as the fungus matures. The exoperidium splits open into four to seven rays that are curved backward overall, with tips curved inward. Expanded fruit bodies are 4–10 cm (1.6–3.9 in) in diameter. The inner surface of the exoperidum is dark brown, with deep cracks when dry. The special inner endoperidium rests upon a short stipe that broadens to a top-shaped, corky base. The height of base and endoperidium is 1–3 cm (0.4–1.2 in), and it is roughly the same width. The fragile, whitish to brownish endoperidium opens irregularly near the top to reveal purplish-brown gleba. In some mature, weathered specimens, the gleba may be completely absent, with only the interior stipe and corky base remaining in the endoperidium. The spores are spherical with faint warts on the surface, and measure 3–5 μm in diameter. Capillitium threads in the gleba are long and sparingly branched, measuring 7–10 μm thick.

== Habitat and distribution ==
The species is known from Texas, where it grows in loamy soil around the decaying stumps of post oak (Quercus stellata).
