= Desert fungi =

Name for several species of fungus

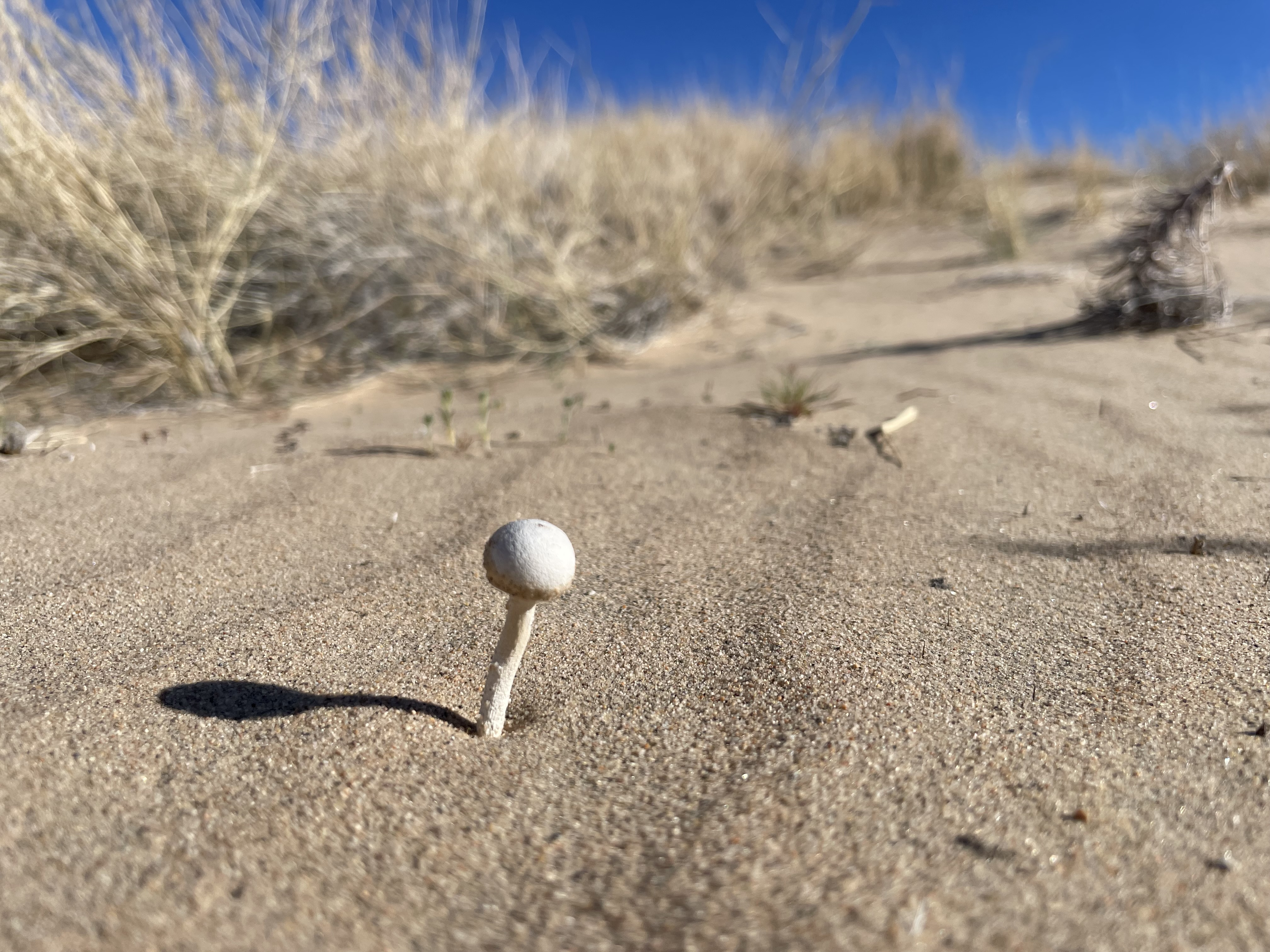
Tulostoma simulans in the Mojave Desert

The desert fungi are a variety of terricolous fungi inhabiting the biological soil crust of arid regions. Those exposed to the sun typically contain melanin and are resistant to high temperatures, dryness and low nutrition. Species that are common elsewhere (e.g. Penicillium spp. and common soil Aspergillus spp.) do not thrive in these conditions. Producing large dark unicellular spores also helps survival. Sexually reproducing ascomycetes, especially Chaetomium spp., have developed resilience by growing thick, dark perithecia. Under desert shrubs, however, more sensitive species such as Gymnoascus reesii prevail.

== Species ==
- Agaricus columellatus
- Agaricus deserticola
- Agaricus evertens
- Astreus hygometricus
- Battarreoides diguetii
- Chlamydopus meyenianus
- Coccidioides
- Disciseda
- Montagnea arenaria
- Podaxis longii
- Podaxis pistillaris
- Tulostoma
