= Wrightoporia casuarinicola =

Scientific classification
- Kingdom: Fungi
- Division: Basidiomycota
- Class: Agaricomycetes
- Order: Russulales
- Family: Bondarzewiaceae
- Genus: Wrightoporia
- Species: W. casuarinicola

Binomial name
- Wrightoporia casuarinicola Y.C.Dai & B.K.Cui (2006)

Species of fungus

Wrightoporia casuarinicola is a species of fungus in the family Bondarzewiaceae. Described as new to science in 2006, it is found in southern China.

== Description ==
It has resupinate (crust-like) fruit bodies, a lilac to vinaceous brown pore surface and simple septate generative hyphae.
