= Wrightoporia lenta =

Scientific classification
- Kingdom: Fungi
- Division: Basidiomycota
- Class: Agaricomycetes
- Order: Russulales
- Family: Bondarzewiaceae
- Genus: Wrightoporia
- Species: W. lenta

Binomial name
- Wrightoporia lenta (Overh. & J.Lowe) Pouzar (1966)

Synonyms
- Poria lenta Overh. & J.Lowe (1946)

Species of fungus

Wrightoporia lenta is a species of fungus in the family Bondarzewiaceae. First described as a species of Poria in 1946, Czech mycologist Zdeněk Pouzar transferred it to Wrightoporia in 1966.
