= List of Tulostoma species =

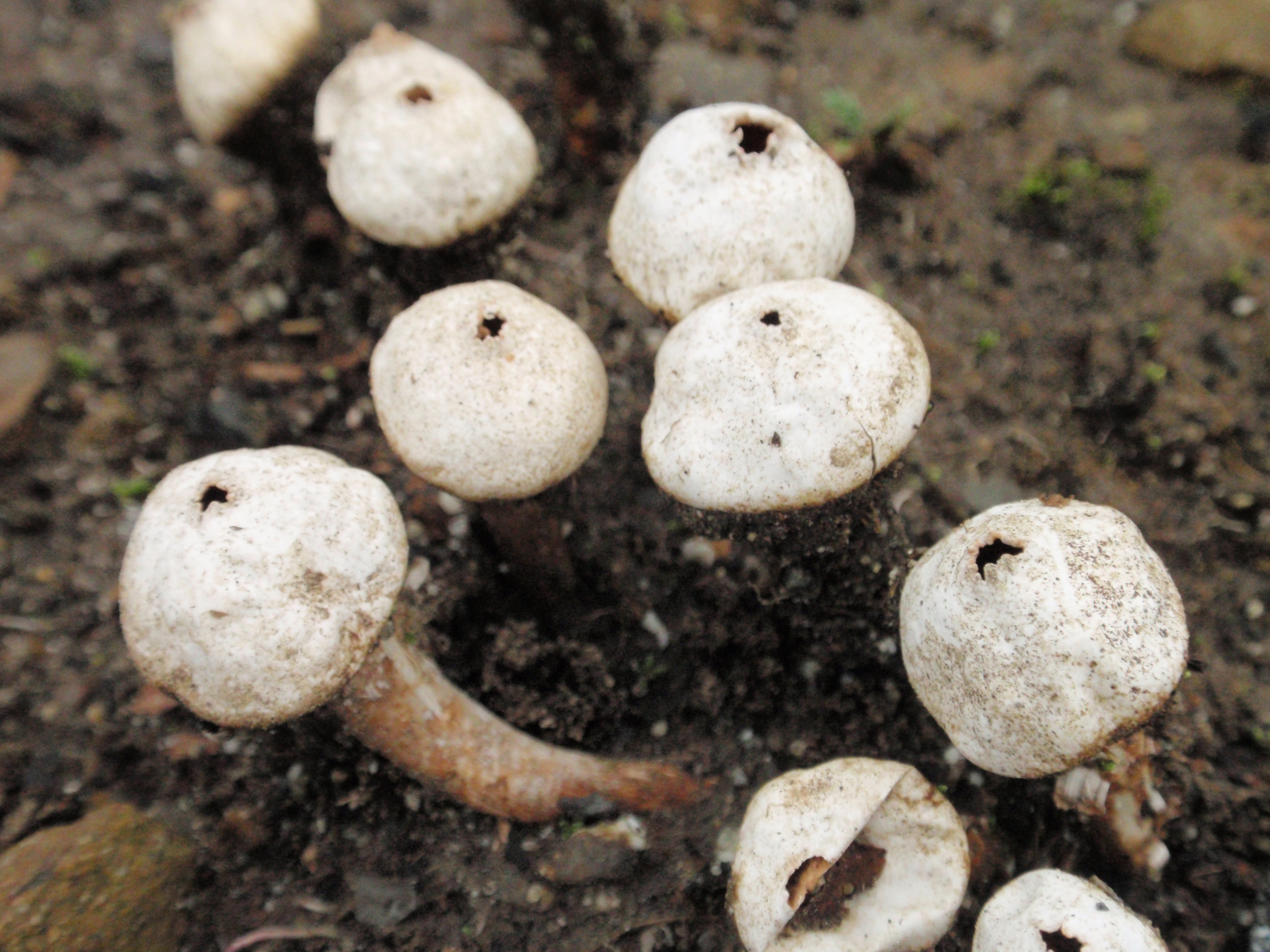
Tulostoma spp.

Tulostoma is a genus of over 100 species of fungi in the family Agaricaceae. Commonly known as stalked puffballs, the cosmopolitan genus consists of species which produce small fruit bodies, characterized by stalks inserted in a socket at the base of the spherical spore-sac opened by a small and apical mouth. The spore-sac contains gleba, a mixture of spores and associated cells; at maturity, the spores are released through one or more apical pores. Tulostoma species prefer xeric microhabitats, savannahs and deserts, and are saprobic—obtaining nutrients by decomposing roots, buried wood and other organic material of plant origin.

The following list of 102 species is compiled from Jorge Eduardo Wright's 1987 world monograph on the Tulostomatales, as well as reports of new taxa described in the literature published since then. Wright included 139 species in his monograph, including 47 "doubtful or critical" species. New species have since been reported from Spain (1992), Mexico (1995), Venezuela (2000), Tunisia (2002), China (2005), and Argentina.

== Infrageneric classification ==
Czech mycologist Zdeněk Pouzar elaborated an infrageneric (below the level of genus) system of classification for Tulostoma species in his 1958 monograph of European taxa. Wright expanded and revised Pouzar's classification system to include all known species:

Subgenus Tulostoma
Series Tubulares

Section Brumalia
Section Hyphales
Section Granulosae
Section Volvulata
Section Meristostoma

Series Fimbriata

Section Fimbriata
Section Poculata
Section Exasperata
Section Dubiostoma
Section Rickiana

Subgenus Lacerostoma

Section Lacerata

== Key ==
Scientific name	Latin binomial name of the species
Section	Section to which the species belongs
Classified	Year in which the species was formally described and classified, as well as the binomial authority on the species
Distribution	Continental distribution of the species; question marks indicate that the evidence is questionable and/or not verifiable
Refs	Citation to the protolog (original publication) and any additional references used to determine distribution

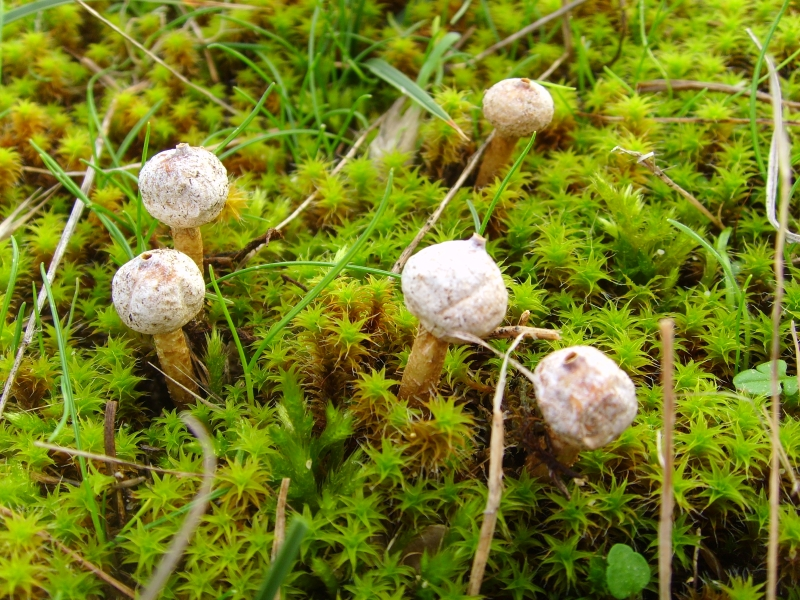
Tulostoma brumale

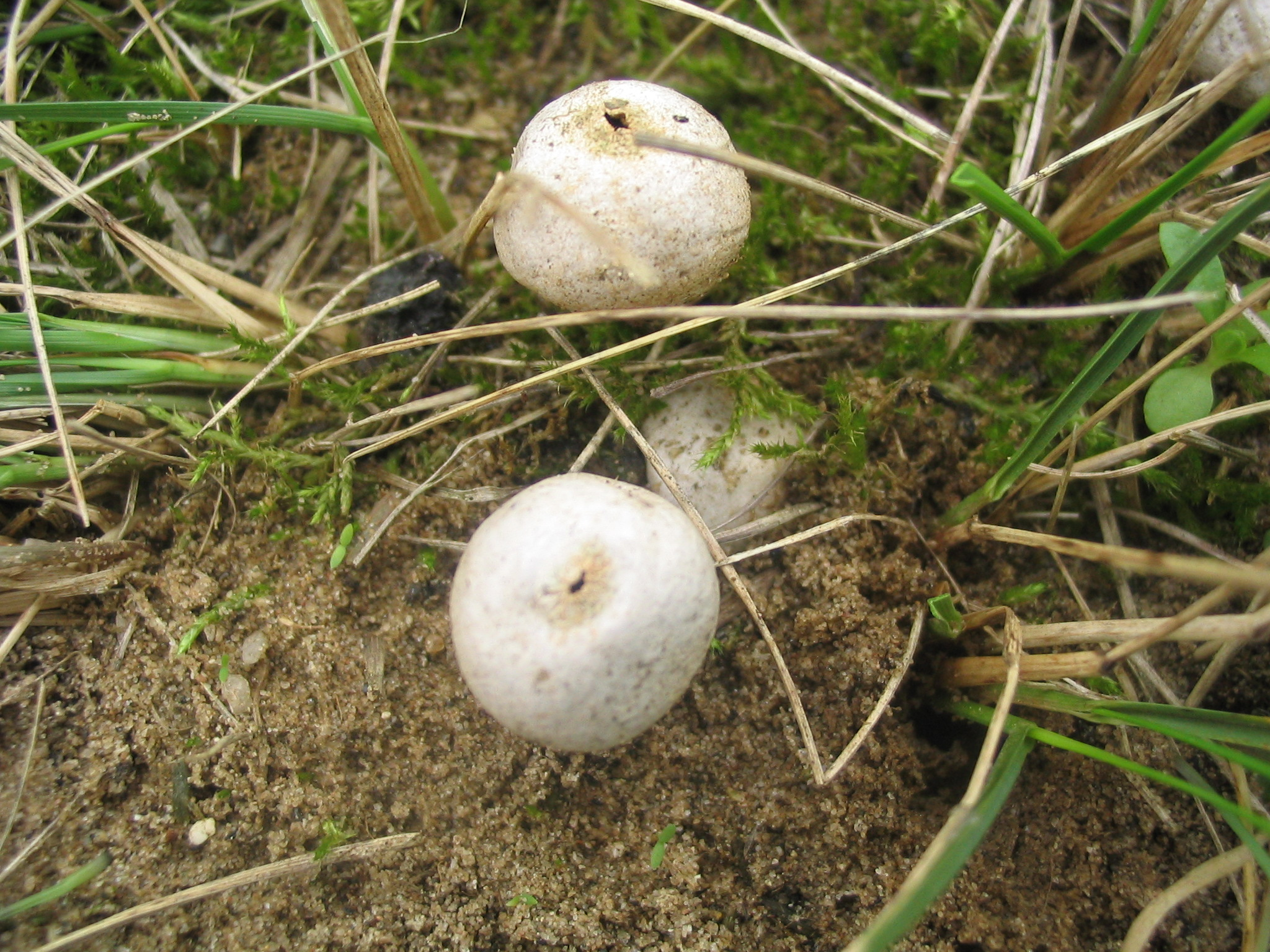
Tulostoma fimbriatum

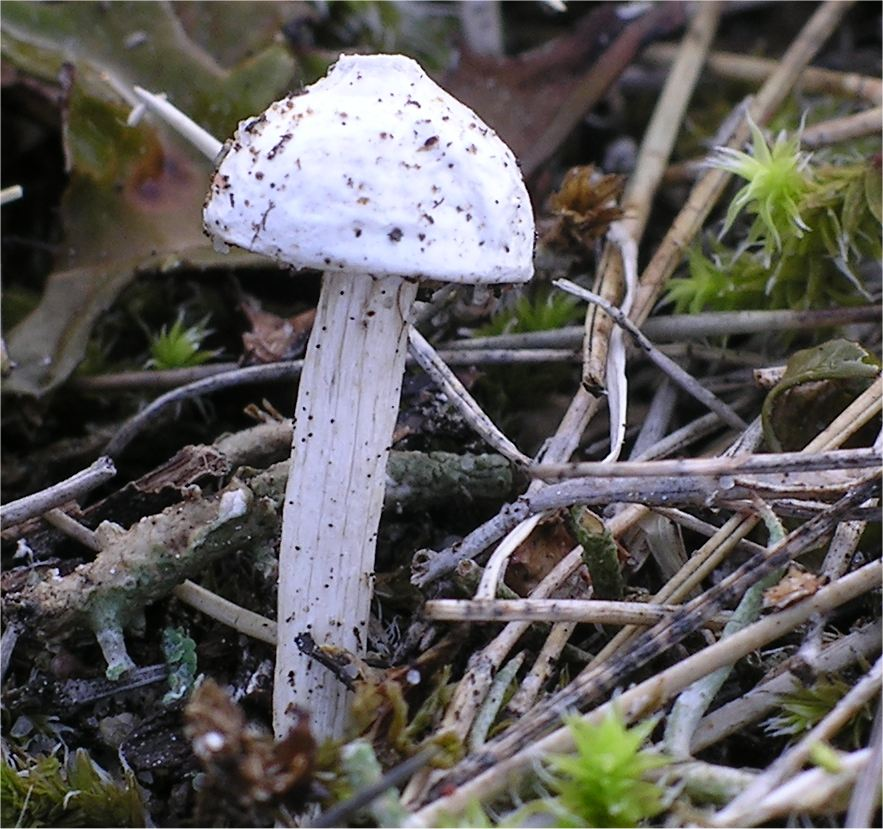
Tulostoma kotlabae

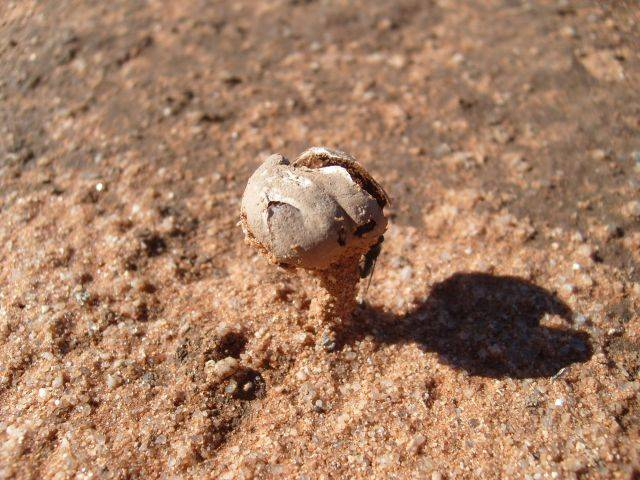
Tulostoma simulans

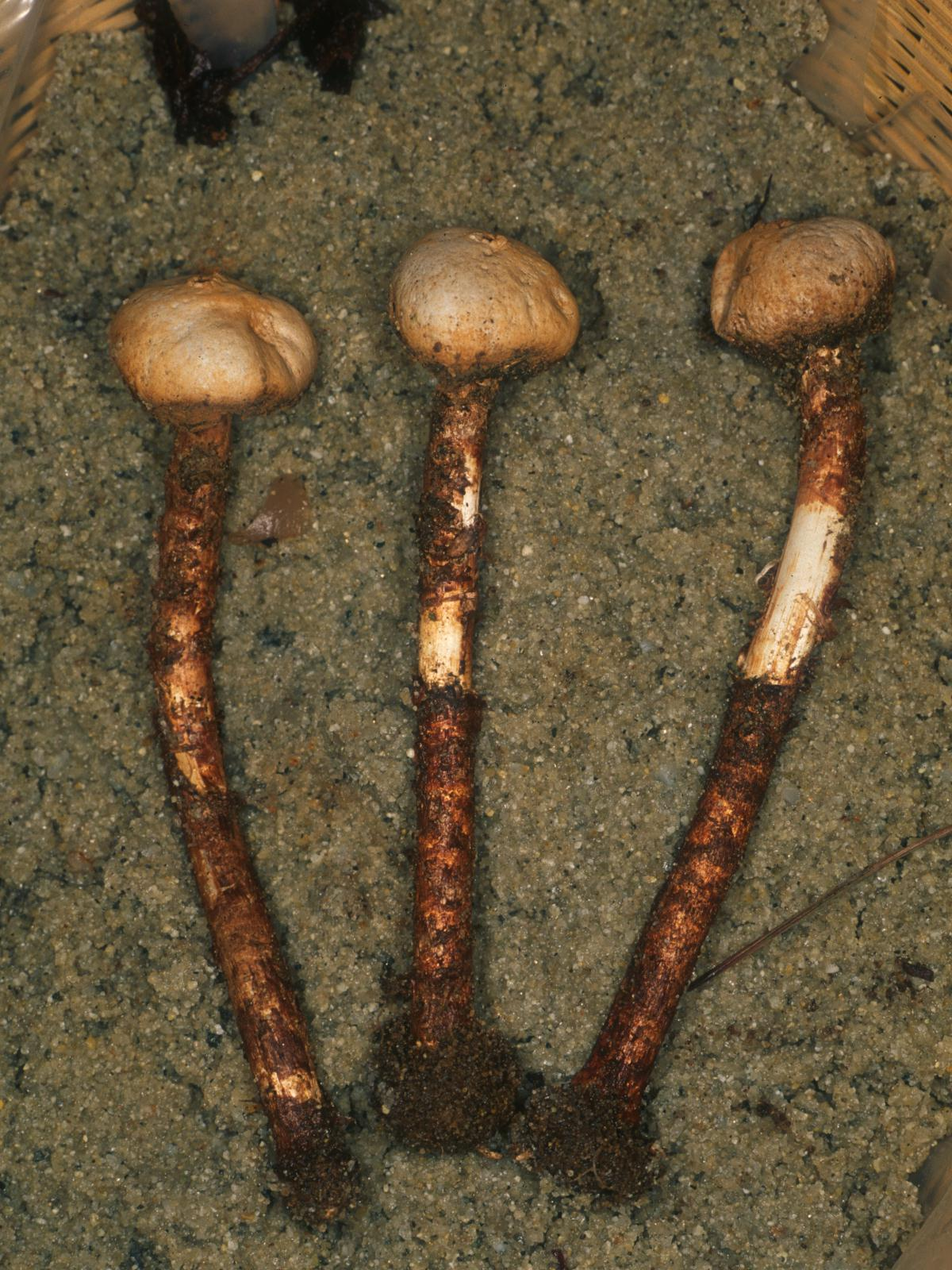
Tulostoma macrocephalum

Scientific name	Classified	Section	Distribution	References
T. adhaerens	1923, Lloyd	Hyphales	Africa, Asia, Australia	
T. albicans	1901, V.S.White		Australia, Europe, North America, South America,	
T. albiceps	1947, Long & S.Ahmad		Asia	
T. albocretaceum	1947, Long & S.Ahmad	Meristostoma	Asia	
T. album	1891, Massee	Meristostoma	Australia	
T. americanum	1906, Lloyd	Brumalia	North America, South America	
T. amnicola	1947, Long & S.Ahmad	Hyphales	Asia, Tunisia	
T. andrejevianum	1970, Philimonova & Schwarzmann	Dubiostoma	Asia	
T. aurasiacum	1905, Pat.	Brumalia	North Africa, Asia (?)	
T. australianum	1906, Lloyd	Lacerata	Africa (?), Australia, South America (?)	
T. beccarianum	1904, Bres.	Brumalia	Southern Europe, South America	
T. berkleyi	1906, Lloyd	Fimbriata	North America	
T. berteroanum	1845, (Lév. ex Lév.) Sacc. & Trotter	Poculata	South America, Tunisia	
T. brasiliense	1972, J.E. Wright	Brumalia	Australia (?), North America, South America	
T. brumale	1794, Pers.		Asia, Europe, North America, South America	
T. caespitosum	1891, Trab.	Brumalia	Africa, Asia, North America, South America	
T. cerebrisporum	2000, J.E.Wright		South America	
T. chevalieri	1911, Har. & Pat.	Hyphales	Africa	
T. chudaei	1907, Pat.	Meristostoma	Africa, Australia, North America, South America	
T. cineraceum	1947, Long	Meristostoma	Asia	
T. clathrosporum	1987, J.E. Wright	Brumalia	North America	
T. costatum	1980, B. Liu		Asia	
T. cretaceum	1944, Long	Lacerata	North America, South America	
T. cyclophorum	1906, Lloyd	Poculata	Africa, Asia, Australia, Europe, North America, South America	
T. delbustoi	1987, J.E. Wright	Fimbriata	South America	
T. dennisii	1987, J.E. Wright	Granulosae	South America	
T. domingueziae	2011, Hern.Caffot		South America	
T. dumeticola	1987, Long	Granulosae	Central America, North America, South America	
T. exasperatosporum	1983, J.E. Wright		Africa	
T. exasperatum	1842, Mont.	Brumalia	Pantropical	
T. excentricum	1944, Long	Hyphales	Asia, North America	
T. exitum	1947, Long & S. Ahmad	Lacerata	Asia	
T. fimbriatum	1829, Fr.	Fimbriata	Europe	
T. floridanum	1906, Lloyd	Hyphales	North America	
T. fulvellum	1904, Bres.	Poculata	Europe, Japan	
T. giganteum	1987, J.E. Wright	Hyphales	North America	
T. giovanellae	1881, Bres.	Brumalia	Africa, Europe	
T. graciliceps	1987, J.E. Wright	Poculata	Africa, Mexico	
T. helanshanense	1978, B. Liu, Z.Y. Li & Du	Brumalia	Asia	
T. herteri	1942, Lohwag & Swoboda	Dubiostoma	North America, South America	
T. hollosii	1956, Z. Moravec	Poculata	Europe	
T. hygrophilum	1947, Long & S. Ahmad	Hyphales	Asia	
T. innermongolicum	1984, Liu	Dubiostoma	Asia	
T. involucratum	1944, Long	Brumalia	Africa, North America, South America	
T. jourdani	1886, Pat.	Hyphales	Africa, Asia, Australia, North America, South America	
T. kogaschiki	1970, Schwarzmann & Philimonova	Hyphales	Asia	
T. kotlabae	1958, Pouzar	Brumalia	Europe	
T. kreiselii	2002, G. Moreno, E. Horak & Altés		Africa	
T. laceratum	1834, Ehrenberg			
T. lacrimisporum	2005, L. Fan & B. Liu		Asia	
T. leiosporum	1909, R.E.Fr.	Fimbriata	South America	
T. lejospermum	1922, Spegazzini	Lacerata	South America	
T. leprosum	1888, (Kalchbr.) Sacc.	Granulosae	Australia	
T. lesliei	1921, Van der Byl	Hyphales	Africa	
T. lloydii	1904, Bres.	Poculata	Europe, North America	
T. longii	1906, Lloyd	Brumalia	North America	
T. lysocephalum	1944, Long	Hyphales	North America	
T. lusitanicum	2000, Calonge & M.G.Almeida		Europe	
T. macalpinianum	1906, Lloyd	Granulosae	Australia, South America	
T. macowanii	1904, Bres.	Poculata	Africa, Australia (?)	
T. macrocephalum	1944, Long	Meristostoma	North America, South America	
T. macrosporium	1925, G.Cunn.	Hyphales	Africa, Australia, North America	
T. melanocyclum	1904, Bres.	Brumalia	Europe, North America	
T. meridionale	1972, J.E.Wright		North America, South America	
T. meristostoma	1944, Long	Meristostoma	North America, South America	
T. mohavei	1920, Lloyd	Hyphales	Asia, North America, South America	
T. montanum	1886, Pat.	Hyphales	Africa, North America, South America	
T. moravecii	1958, Pouzar	Brumalia	Europe	
T. mussooriense	1901, Hennings		Asia	
T. nanum	1987, (Pat.) J.E.Wright	Hyphales	Africa, Asia, Europe, North America, South America	
T. nigeriense	1987, J.E.Wright		Africa	
T. niveum	1978, Kers	Brumalia	Europe	
T. obesum	1878, Cooke & Ellis		South America	
T. obscurum	1972, J.E.Wright	Poculata	North America	
T. opacum	1944, Long	Poculata	North America	
T. pluriosteum	1947, Long & S.Ahmad	Hyphales	Asia	
T. portoricense	1987, J.E.Wright	Fimbriata	Puerto Rico	
T. pseudopulchellum	1992, G.Moreno, Altés & J.E.Wright		Europe	
T. pubescens	1925, G. Cunn.	Hyphales	Australia	
T. pulchellum	1890, Sacc.	Poculata	Africa, Australia, Europe, Middle East, North America, South America	
T. purpusii	1898, Henn.	Brumalia	Africa, Australia, North America, South America	
T. pusillum	1842, Berk.	Granulosae	Asia, Caribbean, South America	
T. pygmaeum	1906, Lloyd	Hyphales	Africa, Australia, North America, South America	
T. readerii	1906, Lloyd	Fimbriata	Australia	
T. reticulatum	1980, B.Liu		Australia	
T. rickii	1906, Lloyd	Rickiana	South America	
T. rivulosum	1947, Long	Hyphales	North America	
T. rufum	1906, Lloyd	Hyphales	Africa, Europe, North America	
T. semisulcatum	1895, Peck	Brumalia	North America	
T. simulans	1906, Lloyd	Brumalia	Africa, Asia, Europe, Central America, North America, South America	
T. sinense	1987, J.E.Wright	Brumalia	Asia	
T. squamosum	1801, Pers.	Brumalia	Europe, North America	
T. striatum	1925, G. Cunn.	Poculata	Africa, Australia, Europe, North America, South America	
T. subfuscum	1901, V.S. White	Poculata	Africa, Australia, North America, Middle East	
T. submembranaceum	1995, G. Moreno, C. Ochoa & J.E. Wright		North America	
T. subsquamosum	1947, Long & S. Ahmad	Hyphales	Asia, South America	
T. thiersii	1987, J.E. Wright	Brumalia	North America, South America	
T. transvaali	1921, Lloyd	Exasperata	Africa	
T. utahense	1987, J.E. Wright		North America	
T. verrucosum	1890, Morgan	Granulosae	North America	
T. verrucicapillitium	2005, L.Fan & B.Liu		Asia	
T. volvulatum	1865, I.G.Borshchov	Volvulata	Africa, Asia, Europe, North America	
T. wightii	1842, Cooke & Ellis	Rickiana	Asia	
T. xerophilum	1946, Long	Brumalia	North America	
