= Loweporus =

Scientific classification
- Kingdom: Fungi
- Division: Basidiomycota
- Class: Agaricomycetes
- Order: Polyporales
- Family: Polyporaceae
- Genus: Loweporus; J.E.Wright (1976)

Type species
- Loweporus lividus (Kalchbr. ex Cooke) J.E.Wright (1976)

Genus of fungi

Loweporus is a genus of fungi in the family Polyporaceae. The genus was circumscribed by Argentinian mycologist Jorge Eduardo Wright in 1976. The genus is named in honour of American mycologist and polypore specialist Josiah Lincoln Lowe.

== Species ==
- Loweporus castaneus Corner (1989)
- Loweporus corticicola Corner (1989)
- Loweporus lividus (Kalchbr.) J.E.Wright (1976)
- Loweporus mollis Corner (1989)
- Loweporus ochraceicinctus Corner (1989)
- Loweporus pileoliferus Corner (1989)
- Loweporus rufescens Corner (1989)
- Loweporus tephroporus (Mont.) Ryvarden (1980)
