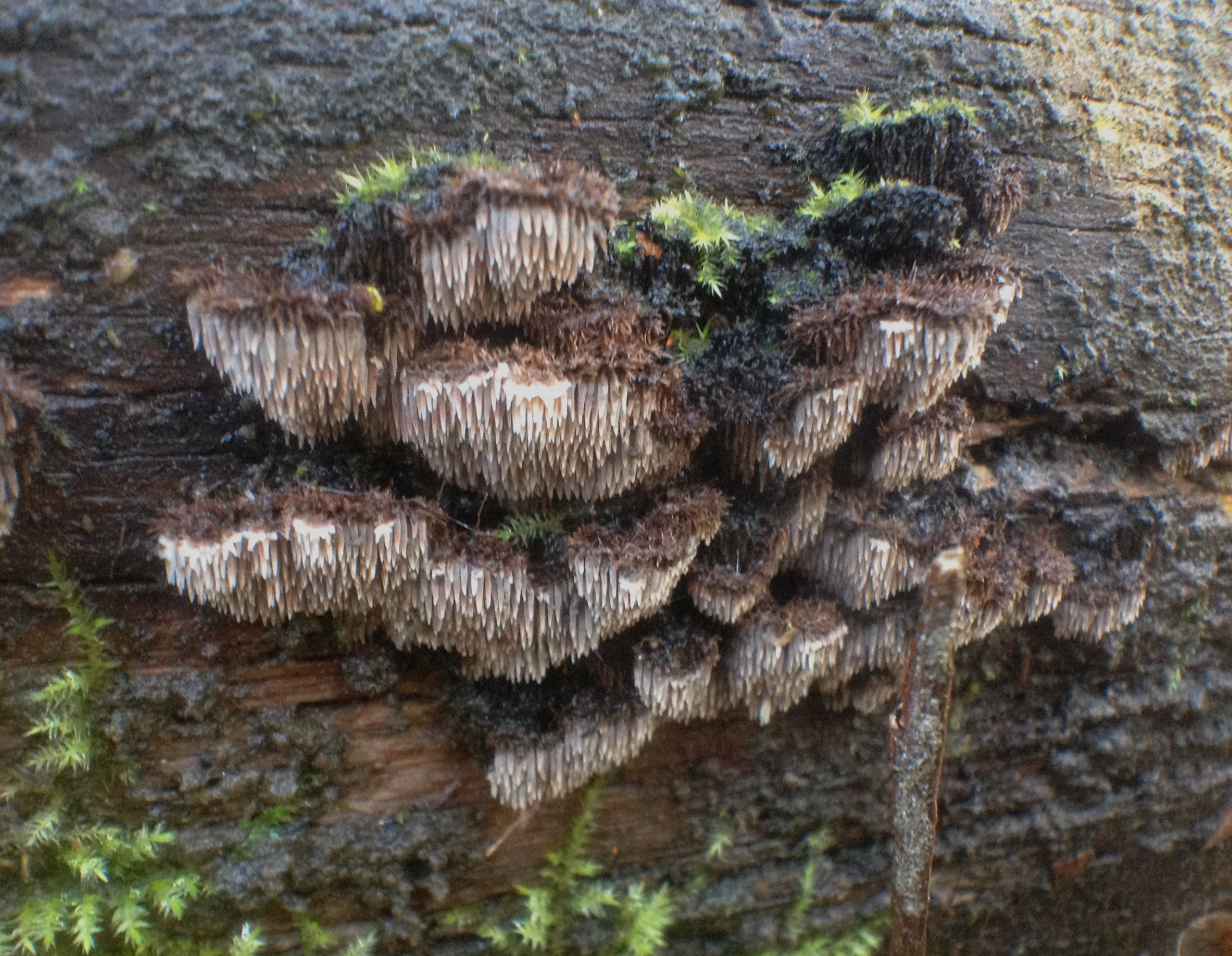

Scientific classification
- Kingdom: Fungi
- Division: Basidiomycota
- Class: Agaricomycetes
- Order: Russulales
- Family: Bondarzewiaceae
- Genus: Gloiodon
- Species: G. strigosus

Binomial name
- Gloiodon strigosus (Sw.) P.Karst.

Synonyms
- Hydnum strigosum Sw. (1810); Sclerodon strigosus (Sw.) P. Karst. (1889); Mycoleptodon strigosus (Sw.) Pat. (1900); Steccherinum strigosum (Sw.) Banker (1906); Pleurodon strigosus (Sw.) Ricken (1918); Leaia piperata Banker (1906); Hydnum piperatum (Banker) Sacc. & Trotter (1912)

= Gloiodon strigosus =

Species of fungus

Gloiodon strigosus is a species of fungus belonging to the family Bondarzewiaceae. It was originally described by Olof Swartz in 1810, and received its current name by Petter Adolf Karsten in 1879.

Like all species of the genus Gloiodon, it is a wood-inhabiting fungus producing annual fruiting bodies with a hydnoid hymenium on dead wood.

It has been reported from the boreal-hemiboreal zones in Europe, North America and Asia. In Europe it is mainly found in Fennoscandia but are considered rare.

== Description ==
Fruiting body is pileate to resupinate, ochreaceous to greyish brown but darkening with age. Forms caps up to 3 cm and resupinate patches up to 6 cm. Pileus broadly attached and covered with stiff, shaggy, dark brown hairs, separated from the context with a thin dark zone. Hymenium with conical spines, up to 1 cm long, with a pale greyish brown colour that turns to a dark ash grey (usually covered in white spore mass) with age or under dry conditions.

The hyphal system has both been described as dimitic and as monomitic with dark sclerified generative hyphae that simulates skeletal hyphae. Spores are hyaline, amyloid and measure 4.5-6 x 3.5-5 µm. Basidia have basal clamps and four sterigmata. Gloeocystidia are present.

Gloiodon strigosus usually forms multiple caps in close approximity, often growing by the edges of resupinate patches.

=== Similar species ===
The hymenium with long spines coupled with a hairy pileus bears resemblance to Auriscalpium vulgare. However, the fruiting bodies of A. vulgare has a long stipe and grows out of Pinus cones on or in the ground.

Other species in the genus Gloiodon have a similar appearance but differ in either substrate or distribution. G. occidentalis grows on conifer wood and G. nigrescens is a tropical species.

== Ecology ==
It is a saprotrophic fungus living on dead trunks of deciduous trees causing white rot. Fruiting bodies are usually growing on fairly hard wood of moss covered trunks. In Europe it is mostly associated with Populus but is also found on other deciduous trees such as Alnus and Salix. Favors older forest habitats with high humidity and a stable stand of deciduous trees.

== Conservation and threats ==
Gloiodon strigosus is classified as Least Concern (LC) in the Finnish national red list, while being classified as Near Threatened (NT) in Norway and Vulnurable (VU) in Sweden. The species is also classified as Imperiled (N2) in Canada.

In Sweden it is regarded as a good indicator of older forest habitats with a long continuity of deciduous trees and high stable humidity. It is sensitive towards all forestry practices that negatively affects the humidity levels and occurrence of deciduous wood.
