= Wrightoporia unguliformis =

Scientific classification
- Kingdom: Fungi
- Division: Basidiomycota
- Class: Agaricomycetes
- Order: Russulales
- Family: Bondarzewiaceae
- Genus: Wrightoporia
- Species: W. unguliformis

Binomial name
- Wrightoporia unguliformis Y.C.Dai & B.K.Cui

Species of fungus

Wrightoporia unguliformis is a species of fungus in the family Bondarzewiaceae. Described as new to science in 2006, it is found in southern China.

== Description ==
Fruit bodies of Wrightoporia unguliformis are woody and hoof-shaped, measuring up to 12 cm (4.7 in) long by 9 cm (3.5 in) wide, and have a distinct rusty brown to dark brown crust. The pore surface is buff to pale brown, and it has thick tube mouths. It has a dimitic hyphal system, with dextrinoid skeletal hyphae. The fungus causes a white rot on angiosperms.
