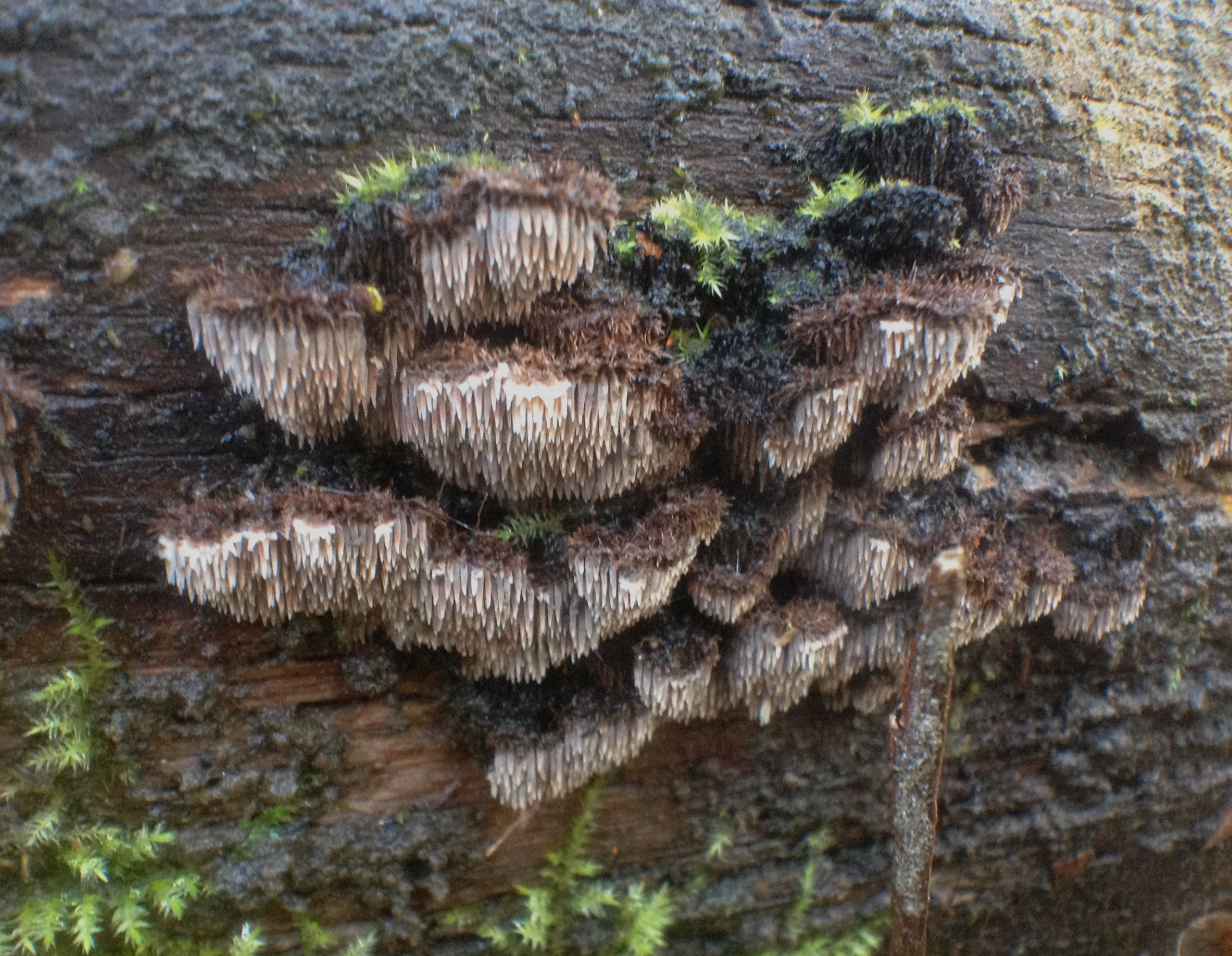
- Gloiodon strigosus

Scientific classification
- Kingdom: Fungi
- Division: Basidiomycota
- Class: Agaricomycetes
- Order: Russulales
- Family: Bondarzewiaceae
- Genus: Gloiodon; P. Karst.

Type species
- Gloiodon strigosus (Sw.) P. Karst.

Species
- G. nigrescens G. occidentalis G. strigosus

= Gloiodon =

Genus of fungi

Gloiodon is a genus of mushrooms in the family Bondarzewiaceae. It was first described by Finnish mycologist Petter Karsten in 1879.

All species in Gloiodon are wood-inhabiting fungi growing on trunks of dead trees causing white rot.

== Description ==
Basidiocarps are pileate or resupinate with a hymenium of conical spines and usually a hairy upper side. Basidiospores are hyaline, rounded, with fine ornamentation and a strong amyloid reaction. Gloeocystidia are present.

== Distribution ==
Gloiodon strigosus is widely distributed in the boreal zones of Eurasia and North America. Gloiodon occidentales has only been reported in North America. Gloiodon nigrescens is only known from tropical regions.

== Taxonomy ==
Gloiodon stratosus is known from fungarium collections of preserved specimens. It is currently not considered to belong in Gloiodon, but the generic placement of this taxon is not resolved.
