= Amylaria =

Scientific classification
- Kingdom: Fungi
- Division: Basidiomycota
- Class: Agaricomycetes
- Order: Russulales
- Family: Bondarzewiaceae
- Genus: Amylaria; Corner

Type species
- Amylaria himalayensis Corner

Genus of fungi

Amylaria is a genus of fungus in the family Bondarzewiaceae. The genus is monotypic, containing the single species Amylaria himalayensis, found in Bhutan.
