= Stecchericium =

Scientific classification
- Kingdom: Fungi
- Division: Basidiomycota
- Class: Agaricomycetes
- Order: Russulales
- Family: Bondarzewiaceae
- Genus: Stecchericium; Reid

Type species
- Stecchericium seriatum (Lloyd) Maas Geest.

Species
- S. abditum S. acanthophysium S. isabellinum S. rusticum S. seriatum

Genus of fungi

Stecchericium is a genus of fungi in the family Bondarzewiaceae. The genus is widespread in tropical regions.
