= Spiniger =

Scientific classification
- Kingdom: Fungi
- Division: Basidiomycota
- Class: Agaricomycetes
- Order: Russulales
- Family: Bondarzewiaceae
- Genus: Spiniger; Stalpers

Type species
- Spiniger curiosus (Parmasto & Zhukov) Stalpers

Species
- Spiniger curiosus Spiniger meineckellus

Genus of fungi

Spiniger is a genus of fungi in the family Bondarzewiaceae. The widespread genus contains two species.
