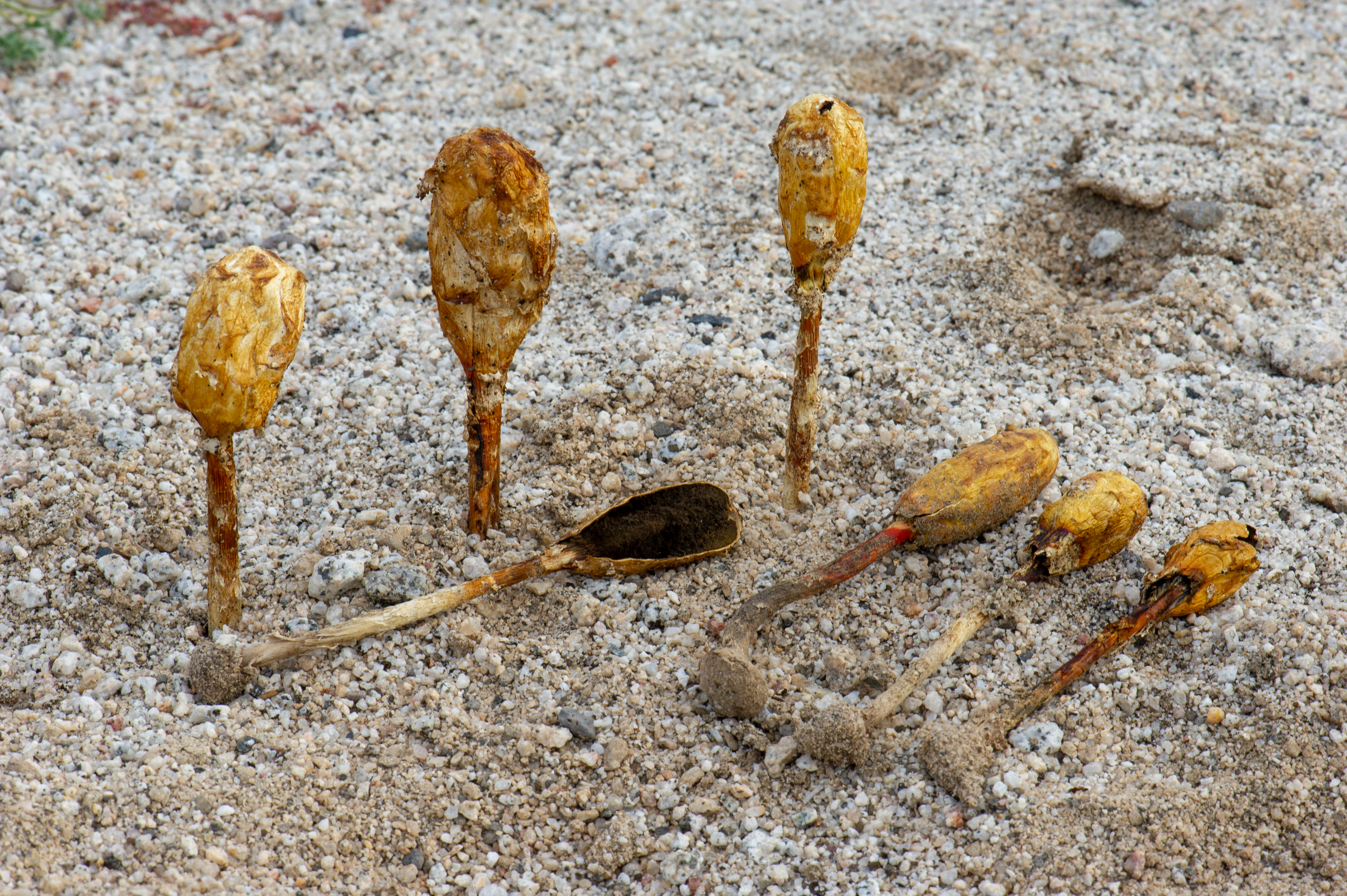
- Podaxis pistillaris

Scientific classification
- Domain: Eukaryota
- Kingdom: Fungi
- Division: Basidiomycota
- Class: Agaricomycetes
- Order: Agaricales
- Family: Agaricaceae
- Genus: Podaxis; Desv. (1809)

Type species
- Podaxis senegalensis Desv. (1809)

= Podaxis =

Genus of fungi

Podaxis is a genus of secotioid fungi in the family Agaricaceae. Species, which have the appearance of a "stalked-puffball", have a worldwide distribution, and tend to be found growing solitary or scattered on sandy soils, especially in arid regions. Although close to 50 species have been described, it has been argued that many of them may represent extremes in the natural range of variations found in Podaxis pistillaris.

== Description ==
Fruiting bodies have the appearance of an unopened Coprinus comatus, with a stipe and a loose, brown to blackish powdery gleba at maturity. Basidiospores are obovate, thick-walled with a large apical pore, and typically 10-17 x 9-12 μm in size. Clamp connections are present.

Podaxis is a common inhabitant of soil and termite mounds throughout the drier regions of the tropics and subtropics of the world. P. pistillaris is a ground-inhabiting species, but most Podaxis species in the rest of the world are associated with termite mounds. This includes the Australian species P. beringamensis.

== Taxonomy ==
The genus was originally named Podaxis and circumscribed by Nicaise Auguste Desvaux in 1809, while Elias Magnus Fries later (1829) called the taxon Podaxon. Although a number of articles have used the latter name, Podaxis is the preferred name as it has nomenclatorial priority due to its earlier publication.

Early suggestions that Podaxis was related to the genus Coprinus were later confirmed using phylogenetic analysis based on sequence data of rDNA genes. This research showed that Podaxis is in a clade with the species Montagnea arenaria and Agaricus pocillator, and the genus Leucocoprinus. For this reason, Podaxis was transferred to the family Agaricaceae (order Agaricales) from the now obsolete family name Podaxaceae (order Podaxales).

A section of Podaxis, named Parvispora, was circumscribed to accommodate three species (P. argentinus, P. longii and P. microsporus) with small spores.

== Species ==
As of January 2016, Index Fungorum accepts 28 species in Podaxis:

- Podaxis africana De Villiers, Eicker & Van der Westh. 1989 – Africa
- Podaxis algericus Pat. 1904
- Podaxis anomalus Lloyd 1920
- Podaxis argentinus Speg. 1898
- Podaxis axatus (Bosc) Massee 1890
- Podaxis beringamensis Priest & M.Lenz 1999 – Australia
- Podaxis carcinomalis (L.f.) Fr. 1829 – Ghana
- Podaxis chevalieri Pat. & Har. 1900
- Podaxis deciduus Bat. 1951
- Podaxis dilabentis Bat. 1951
- Podaxis emerici (Berk.) Massee 1890
- Podaxis farlowii Massee 1890
- Podaxis fastigatus Bat. 1951
- Podaxis ferrandi Mattir. 1913
- Podaxis ghattasensis Henn. 1898
- Podaxis glaziovii Henn. 1897
- Podaxis gollanii Henn. 1901
- Podaxis longii McKnight 1985
- Podaxis macrosporus Speg. 1906
- Podaxis microporus McKnight 1985
- Podaxis muelleri Henn. 1904
- Podaxis patagonicus Speg. 1898
- Podaxis pistillaris (L.) Fr. 1829
- Podaxis rugospora De Villiers, Eicker & Van der Westh. 1989
- Podaxis saharianus G.Moreno & Mornand 1997
- Podaxis senegalensis Desv. 1809
- Podaxis strobilaceus Copel. 1904
- Podaxis subterraneus S.Ahmad 1941

== Uses ==
The dark purple spores of Podaxis species are used by Australian aborigines as a face paint. Podaxis aegyptiacus is used as a common traditional medicine in the Bamako region of Mali for wound-healing, and water extracts from the mushroom have been shown to have carbohydrates with beneficial effects on the immune system in vitro.

== See also ==
- List of Agaricaceae genera
- List of Agaricales genera
