= Wrightoporia =

Scientific classification
- Kingdom: Fungi
- Division: Basidiomycota
- Class: Agaricomycetes
- Order: Russulales
- Family: Bondarzewiaceae
- Genus: Wrightoporia; Pouzar (1966)

Type species
- Wrightoporia lenta (Overh. & J.Lowe) Pouzar (1966)

Genus of fungi

Wrightoporia is a genus of fungi in the family Bondarzewiaceae. According to a 2008 estimate, the widely distributed genus contains 23 species. The genus was circumscribed by Zdeněk Pouzar in Ceská Mykol. vol.20 on page 173 in 1966.

The genus name of Wrightoporia is in honour of Jorge Eduardo Wright (1922–2005), who was an Argentine mycologist.

== Species ==
As accepted by Species Fungorum;

- Wrightoporia afrocinnamomea Ryvarden (2022)
- Wrightoporia araucariae Westph. & Reck (2014)
- Wrightoporia austrosinensis Y.C. Dai (2011)
- Wrightoporia avellanea (Bres.) Pouzar (1966)
- Wrightoporia borealis Y.C. Dai (2010)
- Wrightoporia brunneo-ochracea A. David & Rajchenb. (1985)
- Wrightoporia cinnamomea Ryvarden (1982)
- Wrightoporia cremea Ryvarden (1987)
- Wrightoporia cremella Ryvarden (2016)
- Wrightoporia deviata Decock & Ryvarden (2021)
- Wrightoporia dimidiata A. David & Rajchenb. (1987)
- Wrightoporia flava (Ryvarden) A. David & Rajchenb. (1987)
- Wrightoporia gloeocystidiata I. Johans. & Ryvarden (1979)
- Wrightoporia grandipora Decock & Ryvarden (2020)
- Wrightoporia iobapha (Pat.) Ryvarden (1983)
- Wrightoporia lenta (Overh. & J. Lowe) Pouzar (1966)
- Wrightoporia luteola B.K. Cui & Y.C. Dai (2006)
- Wrightoporia micropora P.K. Buchanan & Ryvarden (2000)
- Wrightoporia microporella Ryvarden (2018)
- Wrightoporia nigrolimitata Jia J. Chen (2012)
- Wrightoporia novae-zelandiae Rajchenb. & A. David (1990)
- Wrightoporia ochrocrocea (Henn. & E. Nyman) A. David & Rajchenb. (1987)
- Wrightoporia palmicola Baltazar & Ryvarden (2016)
- Wrightoporia perplexa Ryvarden (1989)
- Wrightoporia porilacerata Log.-Leite, A.L. Gerber & Ryvarden (1998) – Brazil
- Wrightoporia pouzarii A. David & Rajchenb. (1987)
- Wrightoporia radicata G.Y. Zheng & Z.S. Bi (1997)
- Wrightoporia subavellanea Jia J. Chen & B.K. Cui (2014) – China
- Wrightoporia subrutilans (Murrill) Ryvarden (1982)
- Wrightoporia trametoides (Corner) Stalpers (1996)
- Wrightoporia trimitica (Corner) Stalpers (1996)
- Wrightoporia unguliformis Y.C. Dai & B.K. Cui (2006) – China

Former species;

- W. africana I. Johans. & Ryvarden (1979) = Pseudowrightoporia africana, Hericiaceae family
- W. aurantiporaa T. Hatt. (2008) = Pseudowrightoporia aurantipora, Hericiaceae
- W. biennisa Jia J. Chen & B.K. Cui (2013) = Wrightoporiopsis biennis, Hericiaceae
- W. braceia (Murrill) I. Lindblad & Ryvarden (1999) = Amylosporus bracei, Bondarzewiaceae
- W. campbelliia (Berk.) Teixeira (1992) = Amylosporus campbellii, Bondarzewiaceae
- W. casuarinicolaa Y.C. Dai & B.K. Cui (2006) = Amylosporus casuarinicola, Bondarzewiaceae
- W. cinnamomeaa Ryvarden (2019) = Wrightoporia afrocinnamomea
- W. cylindrosporaa Ryvarden (1982) = Pseudowrightoporia cylindrospora, Hericiaceae
- W. efibulataa I. Lindblad & Ryvarden (1999) = Amylosporus efibulatus, Bondarzewiaceae
- W. gillesiia A. David & Rajchenb. (1987) = Pseudowrightoporia gillesii, Hericiaceae
- W. gyroporaa (Corner) Stalpers (1996) = Amylonotus gyroporus, Bondarzewiaceae
- W. isabellinaa (Corner) Stalpers (1996) = Stecchericium isabellinum, Bondarzewiaceae
- W. japonicaa Núñez & Ryvarden (1999) = Pseudowrightoporia japonica, Hericiaceae
- W. labyrinthinaa T. Hatt. (2008) = Amylonotus labyrinthinus, Bondarzewiaceae
- W. microporaa Aime & Ryvarden (2007) = Wrightoporia microporella
- W. ramosaa A. David & Rajchenb. (1987) = Amylonotus ramosus, Bondarzewiaceae
- W. roseocontextaa Ryvarden & Iturr. (2003) = Wrightoporiopsis roseocontexta, Hericiaceae
- W. rubellaa Y.C. Dai (1995) = Amylosporus rubellus, Bondarzewiaceae
- W. solomonensisa (Corner) T. Hatt. (2003) = Pseudowrightoporia solomonensis, Hericiaceae
- W. stramineaa T. Hatt. (2008) = Pseudowrightoporia straminea, Hericiaceae
- W. subadustaa Z.S. Bi & G.Y. Zheng (1987) = Murinicarpus subadustus, Polyporaceae
- W. neotropicaa Ryvarden (2000) = Wrightoporiopsis neotropica, Hericiaceae
- W. tenuisa (G.Y. Zheng & Z.S. Bi) Stalpers (1996) = Amylonotus tenuis, Bondarzewiaceae
- W. tropicalisa (Cooke) Ryvarden (1980) = Larssoniporia tropicalis, Echinodontiaceae
