= Nidulariopsis =

Scientific classification
- Kingdom: Fungi
- Division: Basidiomycota
- Class: Agaricomycetes
- Order: Geastrales
- Family: Geastraceae
- Genus: Nidulariopsis; Greis

Type species
- Nidulariopsis melanocarpa Greis

Species
- Nidulariopsis iowensis Nidulariopsis melanocarpa

Genus of fungi

Nidulariopsis is a genus of fungi in the family Geastraceae.
