= Jorge Eduardo Wright =

Argentine mycologist (1922–2005)

- Born: April 20, 1922; Buenos Aires
- Died: January 4, 2005 (aged 82)
- Education: University of Buenos Aires; University of Michigan
- Known for: Contributions to the knowledge of Gasteromycetes of South America
- Scientific career
- Fields: Mycology
- Academic advisors: Alexander H. Smith
- Author abbrev. (botany): J.E.Wright

Jorge Eduardo Wright (20 April 1922 – 2005) was an Argentine mycologist. Born in Buenos Aires, he graduated from the University of Buenos Aires in 1949. He was awarded a Latin American Guggenheim Fellowship and studied under Alexander H. Smith at the University of Michigan, under whom he received his Master of Science degree in botany in 1955. A year later he was awarded his doctorate from the University of Buenos Aires based on his research on the gasteromycetes and other basidiomycetes. Wright became a full professor in systematic botany at this university in 1960, a position he held until his retirement in 1988. During his career, he published over 120 scientific articles and several books.

In 1966, botanist Zdeněk Pouzar published a genus of fungi in the family Bondarzewiaceae, as Wrightoporia in Wright's honour.
