= Amylosporus =

Scientific classification
- Kingdom: Fungi
- Division: Basidiomycota
- Class: Agaricomycetes
- Order: Russulales
- Family: Bondarzewiaceae
- Genus: Amylosporus; Ryvarden

Type species
- Amylosporus campbellii (Berk.) Ryvarden

Species
- A. bracei A. campbellii A. daedaliformis A. ryvardenii A. wrightii

Genus of fungi

Amylosporus is a genus of fungi in the family Bondarzewiaceae. The genus contains five species that are widely distributed in tropical regions.
