= Gasteroid fungi =

Group of fungi

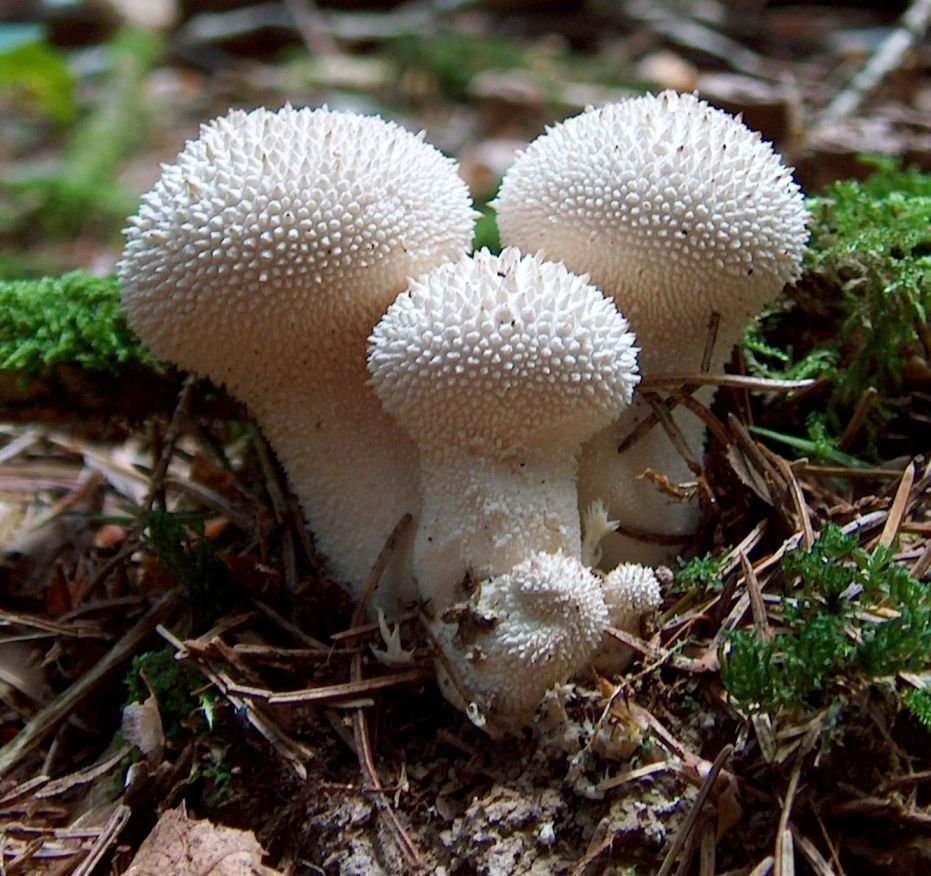
The puffball Lycoperdon perlatum in Germany

The gasteroid fungi are a group of fungi in the Basidiomycota. Species were formerly placed in the obsolete class Gasteromycetes (literally "stomach fungi"), or the equally obsolete order Gasteromycetales, because they produce spores inside their basidiocarps (fruit bodies) rather than on an outer surface. However, the class is polyphyletic, as such species—which include puffballs, earthballs, earthstars, stinkhorns, bird's nest fungi, and false truffles—are not closely related to each other. Because they are often studied as a group, it has been convenient to retain the informal (non-taxonomic) name of "gasteroid fungi".

== History ==
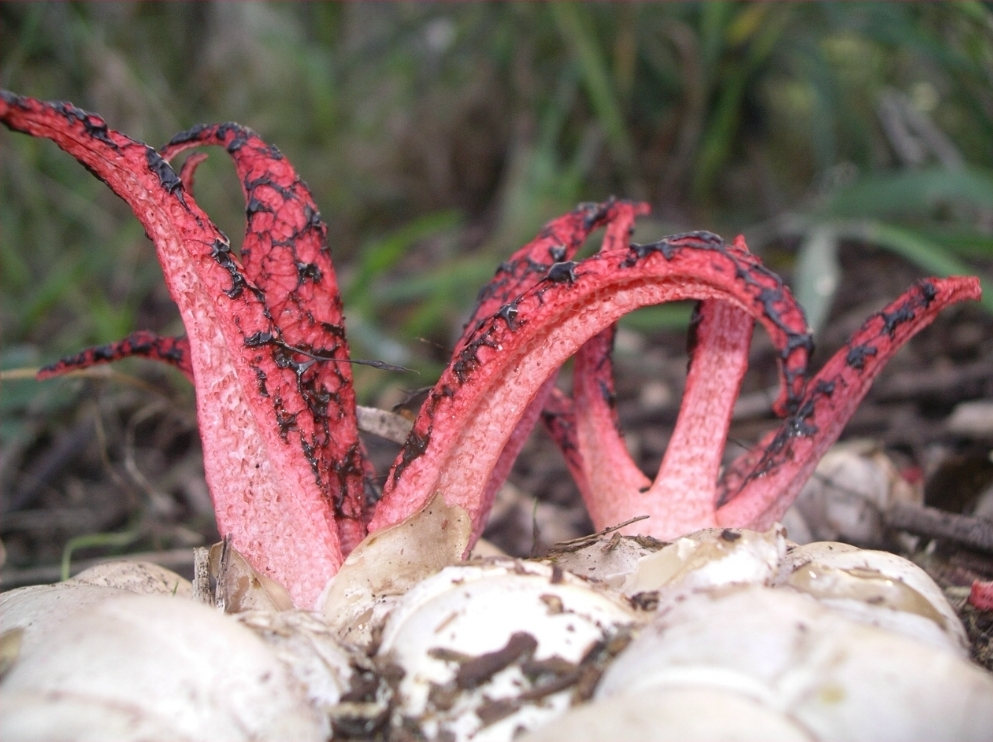
Devil's fingers, Clathrus archeri, emerging from its gasteroid 'eggs'

Several gasteroid fungi—such as the stinkhorn, Phallus impudicus L.—were formally described by Carl Linnaeus in his original Species Plantarum of 1753, but the first critical treatment of the group was by Christiaan Hendrik Persoon in his Synopsis methodica fungorum of 1801. Until 1981, this book was the starting point for the naming of Gasteromycetes under the International Code of Nomenclature for algae, fungi, and plants. Although the starting point was subsequently put back to 1753, names of gasteroid fungi used in Persoon's book are still sanctioned and cannot be replaced by earlier names. Elias Magnus Fries introduced the name Gasteromycetes for a class of fungi in his Systema Mycologicum of 1821, although (not using a microscope) he included many species of the Ascomycota (such as truffles) within the class. Fries contrasted the Gasteromycetes with the Hymenomycetes, where spores are produced externally on gills, pores, and other surfaces.

This convenient division continued to be used for the next 150 years or so, although by the middle of the twentieth century it had become evident that Gasteromycetes was an artificial class (bringing together a miscellany of unrelated species) and not a natural one. In a 1995 study of British species, by Pegler et al. noted that "these fungi represent an heterogeneous assemblage, a mixture of forms which are derived from various lineages.... [they] can be collectively referred to as gasteroid fungi, but they cannot be classified as a single group." DNA-based systematic research has confirmed the diversity of the gasteroid fungi; According to a 2011 estimate, gasteroid fungi comprise about 8.4% of the known Agaricomycetes.

== Description and genera ==
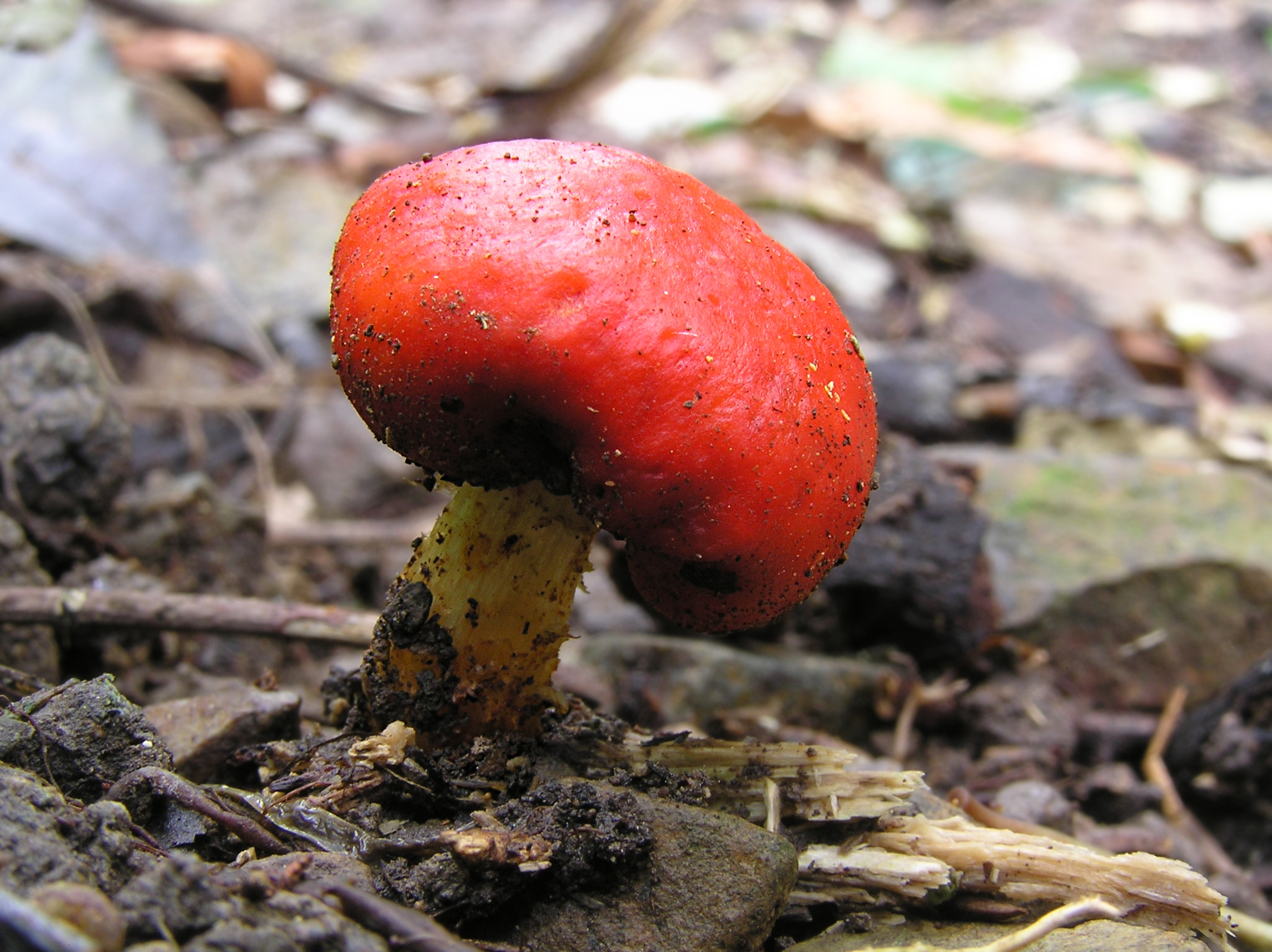
The berry-like red-pouch fungus, Leratiomyces erythrocephalus, New Zealand

The gasteroid fungi form visibly diverse fruit bodies, but in all cases the spores are formed and reach maturity internally. They are not discharged forcibly, as in agarics and most other members of the Basidiomycota, but are released passively in a variety of different ways.

In the puffballs, which include the genera Lycoperdon, Bovista, and Calvatia, spores are formed within spherical to pestle-shaped fruit bodies and are released either by wind (as the fruit body wears away, exposing the spore mass inside) or by raindrops. In the latter case, the fruit bodies develop an ostiole (apical hole) through which spores are puffed out by the pressure of raindrops falling on the fruit body surface. The same ingenious mechanism has evolved separately in the earthstars (Geastrum species), which have a hard outer layer to the fruitbody that splits open in a star-like manner to reveal the puffball-like spore sack.

The stinkhorns and their allies, including the genera Phallus, Mutinus, Clathrus, and Lysurus, form spores within internally gelatinous, puffball-like 'eggs'. At maturity the eggs split and various strange spore-receptacles emerge. The spores are coated with a putrid smelling slime that attracts flies—these being the agents of dispersal.

The bird's nest fungi, which include the genera Cyathus and Crucibulum, form miniature, egg-like packets of spores within cup-shaped fruit bodies. These packets of spores are ejected by rain-splash and may land some distance away, the packets gradually wearing away to release the spores themselves.

False truffles in such genera as Rhizopogon, Hymenogaster, and Melanogaster develop underground or at the soil surface. As with the true truffles, some of them have distinctive smells and are actively hunted out by small mammals which may consume them and spread their spores. Some New Zealand secotioid fungi in the genus Leratiomyces are shaped and coloured like berries and their spores may be dispersed by ground-dwelling birds.

== Habitat and distribution ==
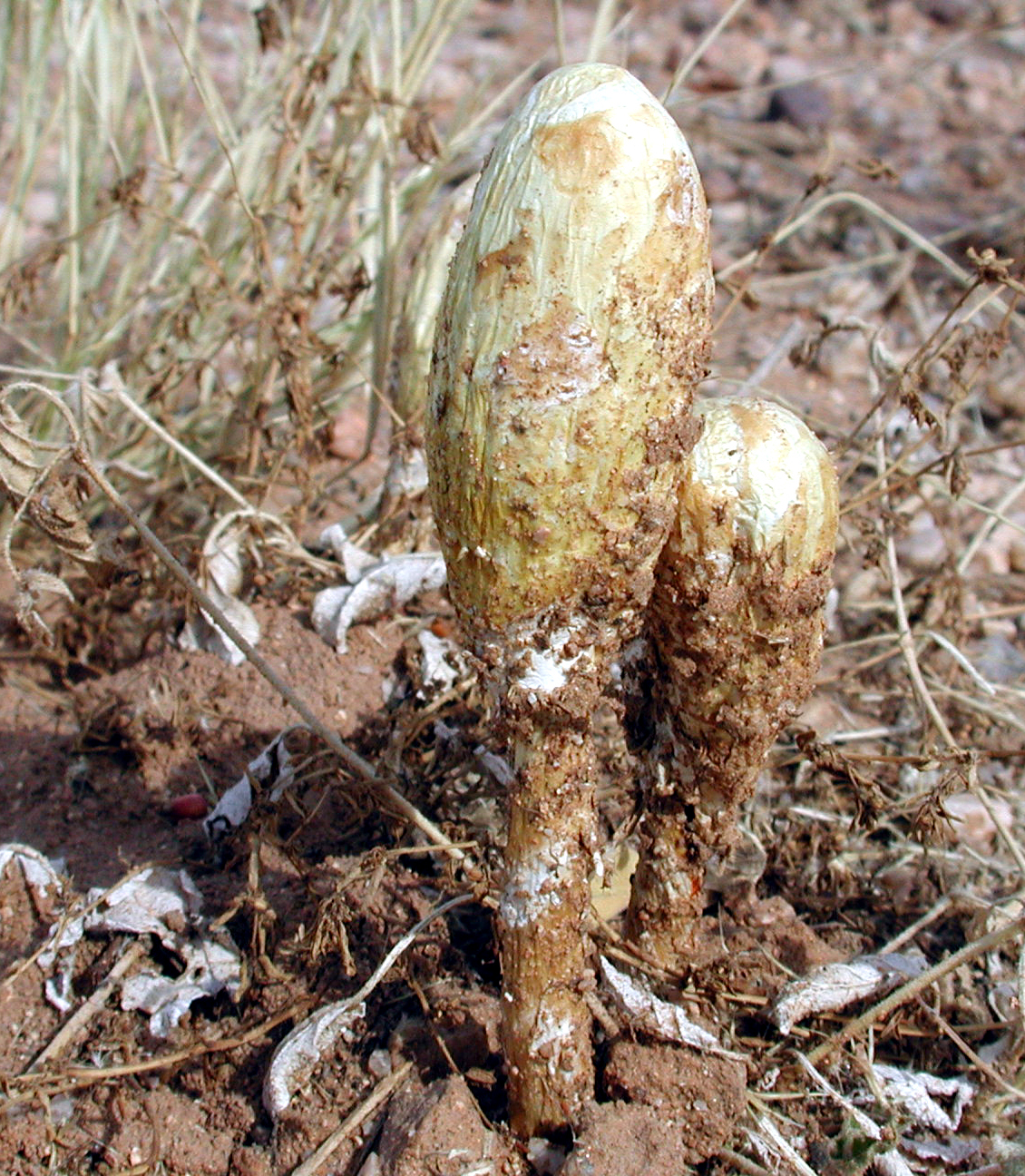
Podaxis pistillaris, a gasteroid fungus adapted to arid conditions

Most gasteroid fungi are saprotrophic, living on dead plant material, including very rotten, fallen wood.

The earthballs (Scleroderma species), dyeballs (Pisolithus species), and many false truffles are ectomycorrhizal, forming a mutually beneficial relationship with the roots of living trees.

These species are cosmopolitan, but the stinkhorns and their allies are most diverse in the wet tropics.

Producing spores in an enclosed fruit body is a suitable adaptation for growing in arid conditions. Several genera, including Podaxis, Battarrea, Phellorinia, and Tulostoma, are typical of steppes and deserts, some also occurring in sand dunes in temperate zones.
