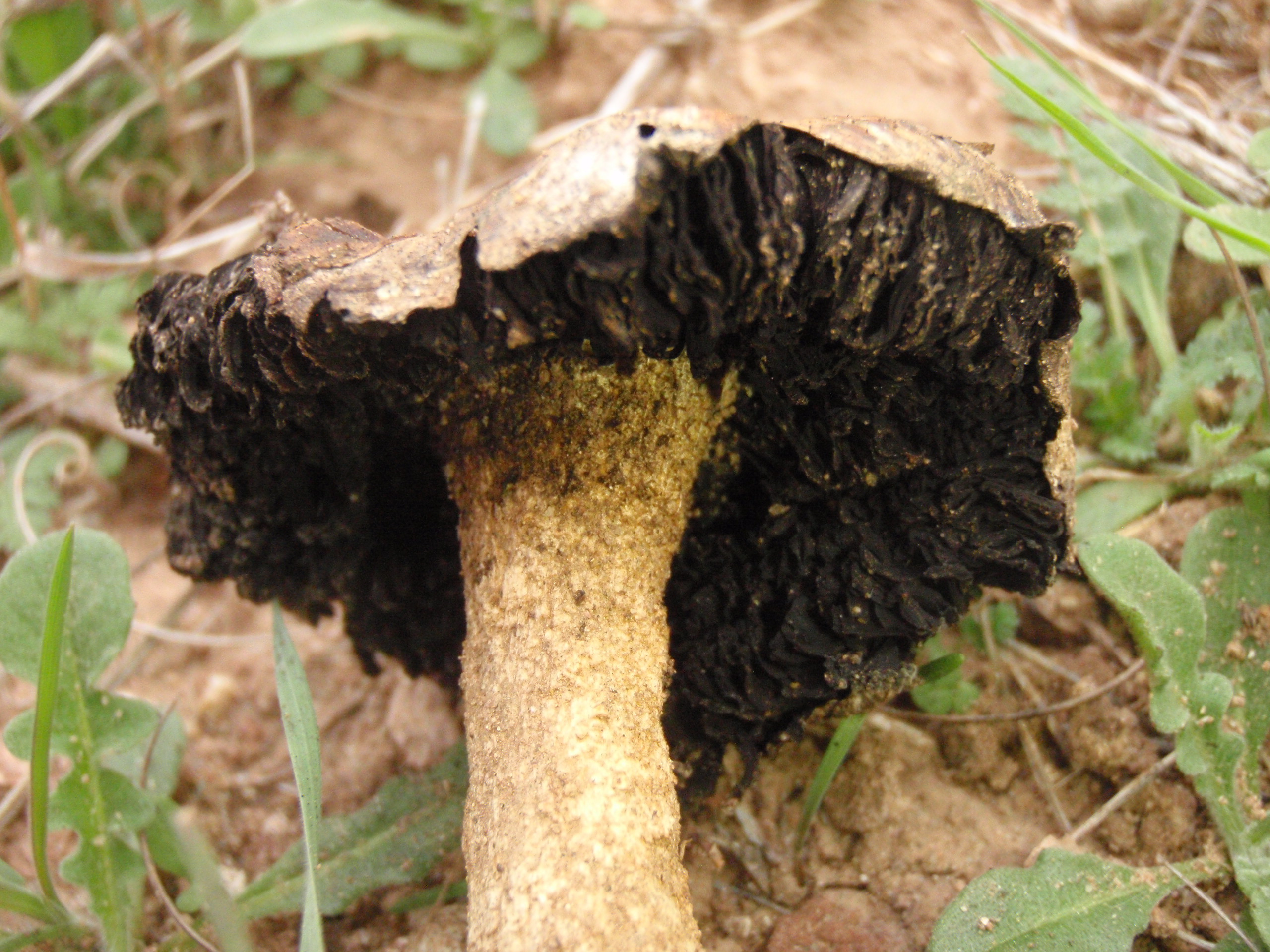
- Montagnea arenaria

Scientific classification
- Kingdom: Fungi
- Division: Basidiomycota
- Class: Agaricomycetes
- Order: Agaricales
- Family: Agaricaceae
- Genus: Montagnea; Fr. (1836)

Type species
- Montagnea arenaria (DC.) Zeller (1943)

Synonyms
- Montagnites Fr. (1838); Montagnea (Pallas) Šebek

= Montagnea =

Genus of fungi

Montagnea is a genus of fungi in the family Agaricaceae. The genus has a widespread distribution in subtropical dry areas, and contains six species. Montagnea was circumscribed by Swedish mycologist Elias Magnus Fries in 1836.

The genus name of Montagnea is in honour of Jean Pierre François Camille Montagne (1784–1866), who was a French military physician and botanist who specialized in the fields of bryology and mycology.

== Species ==
As accepted by GBIF;

- Montagnea arenaria (DC.) Zeller, 1943
- Montagnea argentina (Speg.) Singer, 1969
- Montagnea candollei (Fr.) Fr. 1854
- Montagnea psamathonophila (Speg.) Raithelh. 1990
- Montagnea radiosa (Pall.) Šebek, 1954
- Montagnea tenuis (Pat.) Teng, 1964

== See also ==
- List of Agaricaceae genera
- List of Agaricales genera
