= Ballistospore =

A ballistospore or ballistoconidia is a spore that is discharged into the air from a living being, usually a species of fungus. With fungi, most types of basidiospores formed on basidia are discharged into the air from the tips of sterigmata. At least 30 thousand species of mushrooms, basidiomycete yeasts, and other fungal groups may discharge ballistospores, sometimes at initial accelerations exceeding 10 thousand times g.
