= Phialastrum =

Scientific classification
- Kingdom: Fungi
- Division: Basidiomycota
- Class: Agaricomycetes
- Order: Geastrales
- Family: Geastraceae
- Genus: Phialastrum; Sunhede

Type species
- Phialastrum barbatum (Dissing & M. Lange) Sunhede

Genus of fungi

Phialastrum is a genus of fungi in the family Geastraceae. A monotypic genus, it contains the single species Phialastrum barbatum, described by Sunhede in 1989.
