= Josiah Lincoln Lowe =

American mycologist

Josiah Lincoln Lowe (13 February 1905 – 30 April 1997) was an American mycologist who specialized in the study of polypores. Lowe was born in Hopewell, New Jersey, where he attended primary school and high school. In 1927, he graduated with a Bachelor of Science degree from Syracuse University in Syracuse, New York, and received a doctorate from the University of Michigan in 1938, with Calvin H. Kauffman and Edwin Butterworth Mains as his main academic supervisors. His doctoral thesis was entitled The genus Lecidea in the Adirondack Mountains of New York. That year, he started his academic career at the College of Forestry, a position he held for almost 40 years. Lowe was the president of the Mycological Society of America in 1960. He retired in 1975 and became an emeritus professor. In the 1980s, Lowe was diagnosed with Alzheimer's disease; he died in Syracuse.

Several fungal taxa have been named in his honor, including the species Leptoporus lowei Pilát, Lindtneria lowei M. J. Larsen, Ploioderma lowei Czabator, and Polyporus lowei Burdsall & Lombard, and the genera Loweporus J. E. Wright, Loweomyces (Kotl. & Pouzar) Jülich.
