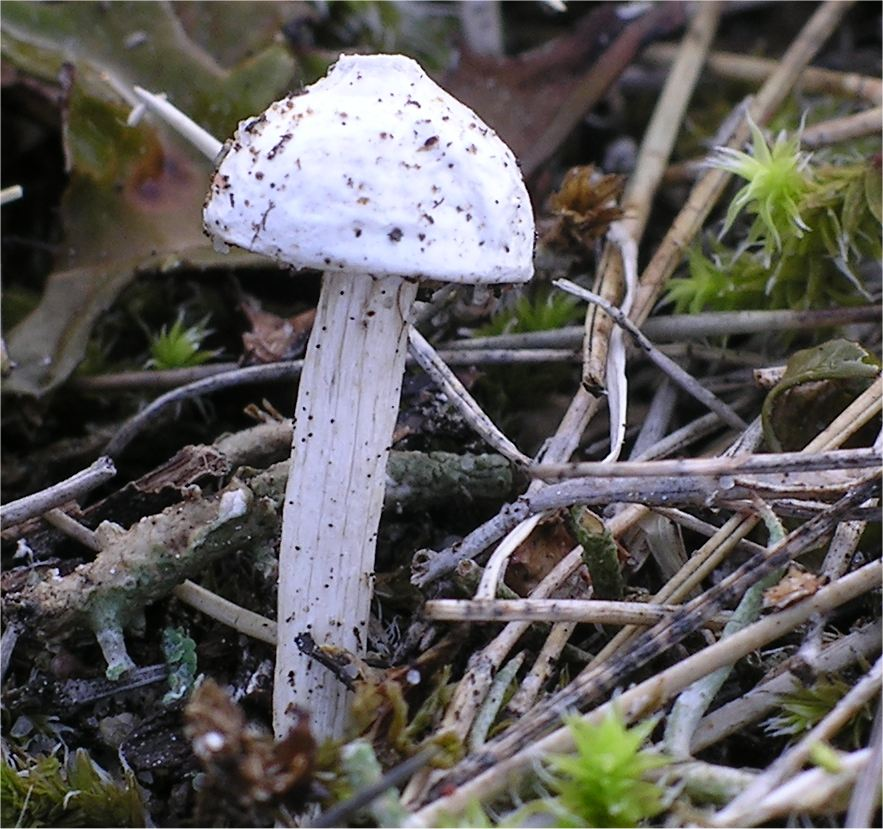
- Tulostoma kotlabae
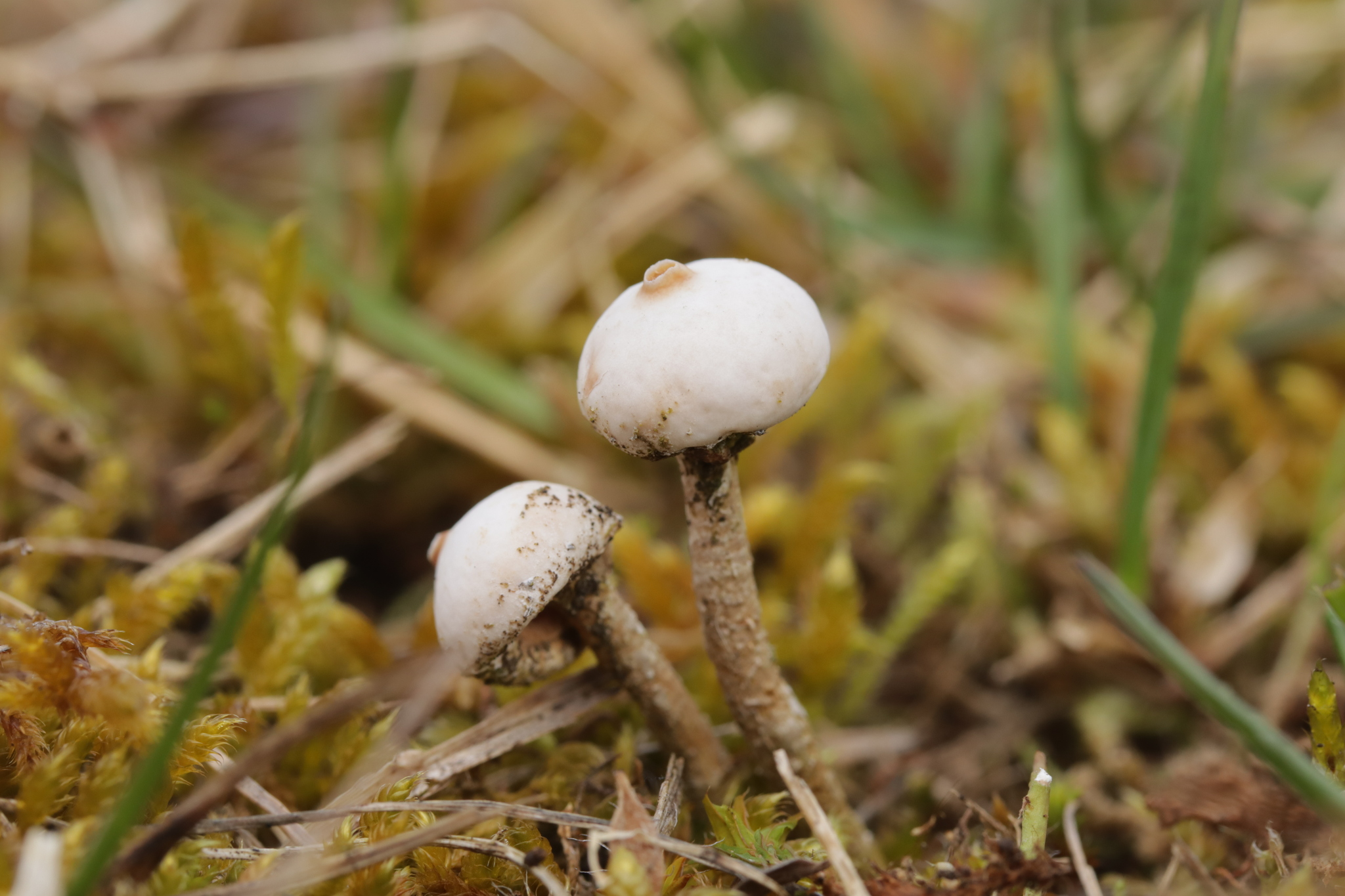
- Tulostoma brumale

Scientific classification
- Kingdom: Fungi
- Division: Basidiomycota
- Class: Agaricomycetes
- Order: Agaricales
- Family: Agaricaceae
- Genus: Tulostoma; Pers. (1794)

Type species
- Tulostoma mammosum P.Micheli ex Fr. (1829)

Synonyms
- Tulasnodea Fr. (1840)

= Tulostoma =

Genus of fungi

Tulostoma is a genus of fungi in the family Agaricaceae. Species in the genus are commonly known as stalkballs, or stalked puffballs. The cosmopolitan genus consists of species which produce small fruit bodies, characterized by stalks inserted in a socket at the base of the spherical spore-sac opened by a small and apical mouth. The spore-sac contains gleba, a mixture of spores and associated cells; at maturity, the spores are released through one or more apical pores. Tulostoma species prefer xeric microhabitats, savannahs and deserts, and are saprobic—obtaining nutrients by decomposing roots, buried wood and other organic material of plant origin. Fossils of Tulostoma have been reported from 12 million year old rocks in central England and 13.5 million year old coals from Slovakia.

== See also ==
- List of Agaricaceae genera
- List of Agaricales genera
- List of Tulostoma species
