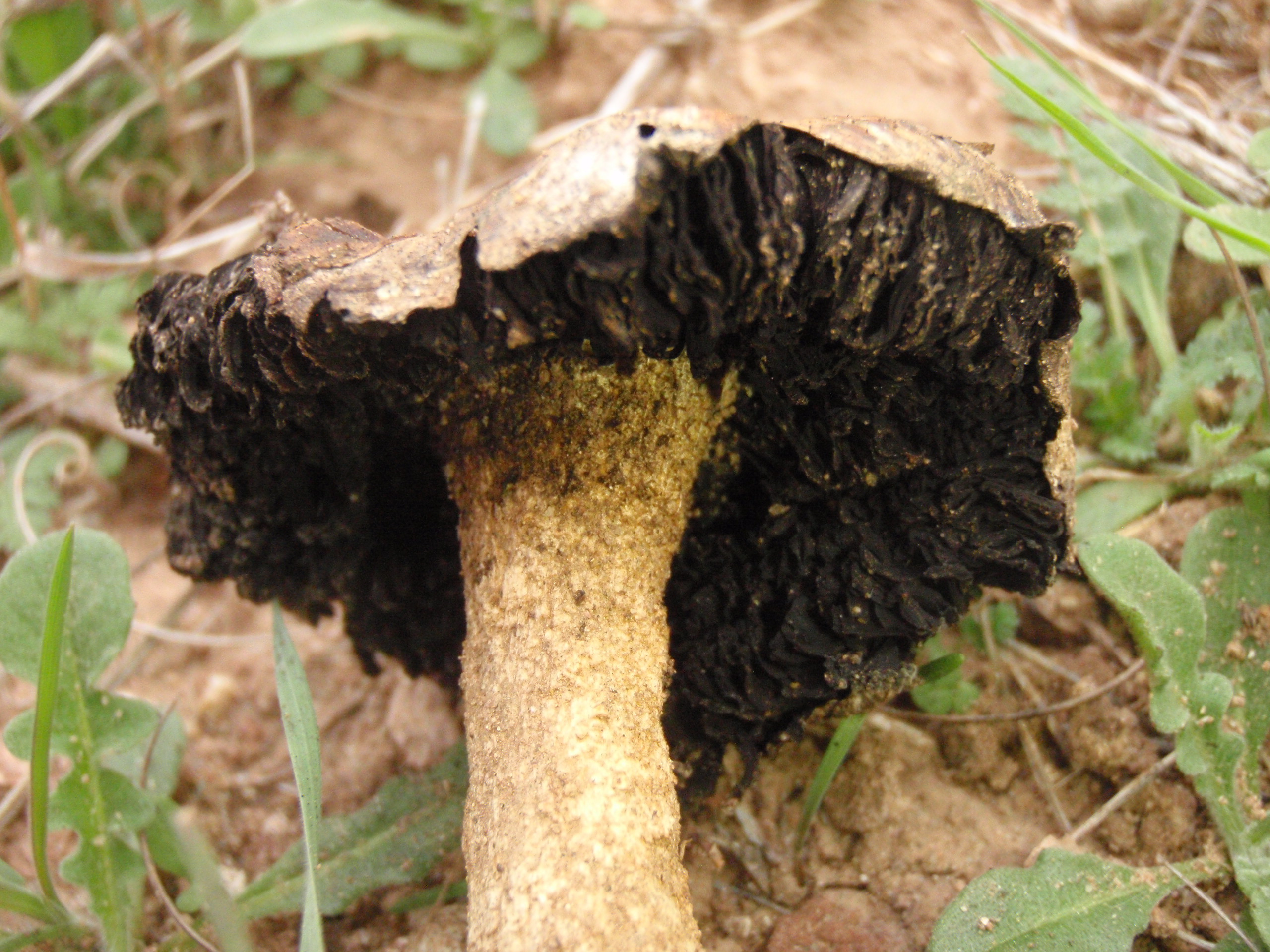

Scientific classification
- Kingdom: Fungi
- Division: Basidiomycota
- Class: Agaricomycetes
- Order: Agaricales
- Family: Agaricaceae
- Genus: Montagnea
- Species: M. arenaria

Binomial name
- Montagnea arenaria (DC.) Zeller (1943)

Synonyms
- Agaricus arenarius DC. (1815); Montagnites candollei Fr. (1838); Montagnea candollei (Fr.) Fr. (1854); Montagnites arenarius (DC.) Morse (1948)

= Montagnea arenaria =

Species of fungus

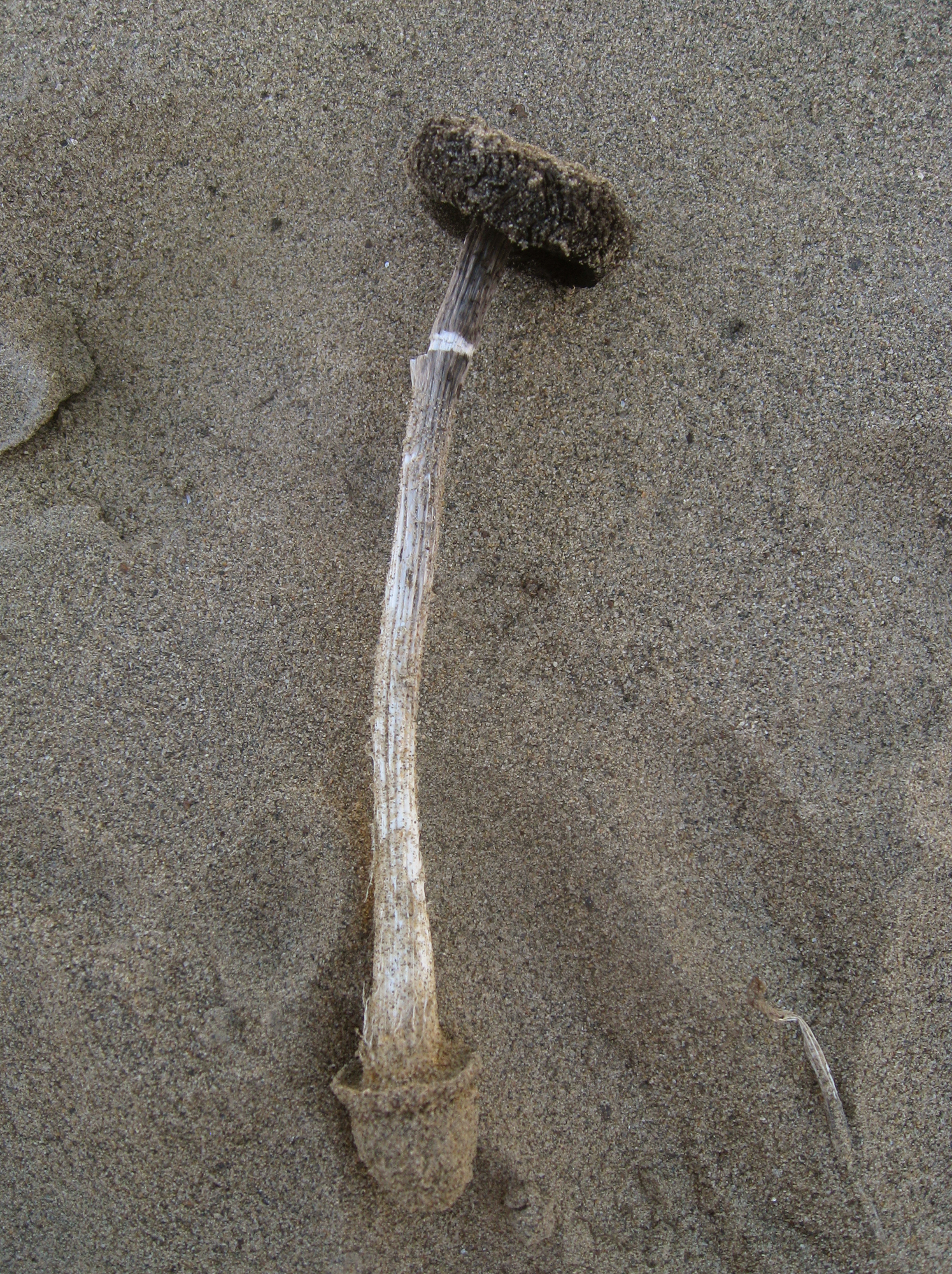
Full mushroom, photographed in Vantage, Washington, showing species variability

Montagnea arenaria
- Mycological characteristics
- Gills on hymenium
- Cap is flat
- Hymenium attachment is irregular or not applicable
- Stipe has a volva
- Edibility is inedible

Montagnea arenaria, commonly known as the gasteroid coprinus, is a species of secotioid fungus in the family Agaricaceae. Commonly found in desert habitats, the species is characterized by a cap that has an apical disc up to 5 centimetres (2 in) wide, radial gills, a hymenophore, and spores with a prominent germ pore. The morphology of this species is widely variable and it is inedible.

== Habitat & Distribution ==
The distribution of Montagnea arenaria is near global although its full range is not known yet. It has been sampled in dry areas on every continent except for Antarctica. It favors hot, desert and xeric terrain but has been found in temperate in regions in dried pastures.

== Taxonomy ==
In 1836 the genus Montagnae was first described by E. M. Fries, named for mycologist C. Montagne who procured the first specimen for genetic sampling. Originally named Agaricus arenarius by Augustin Pyramus de Candolle in 1815, it was transferred to the genus Montagnea by Sanford Myron Zeller in 1943. Despite a high level of geographic isolation and morphological variation in populations, individuals of this species are shown to be biologically compatible and genetically similar.

=== Other Common Names: ===
While commonly known as the gasteroid coprinus, the fungus is also referred to as the Desert Inkcap despite not being classified as an inkcap or a member of the coprinus genus. In South Africa species in the genus Montagnea are known as Namaqua Black Caps after being unofficially described in Veldgids tot die sampioene van Suid-Afrika.

== Edibility ==
The edibility of Montagnea arenaria is not well documented. However, a few sources claim it to be inedible thus it should be avoided.
