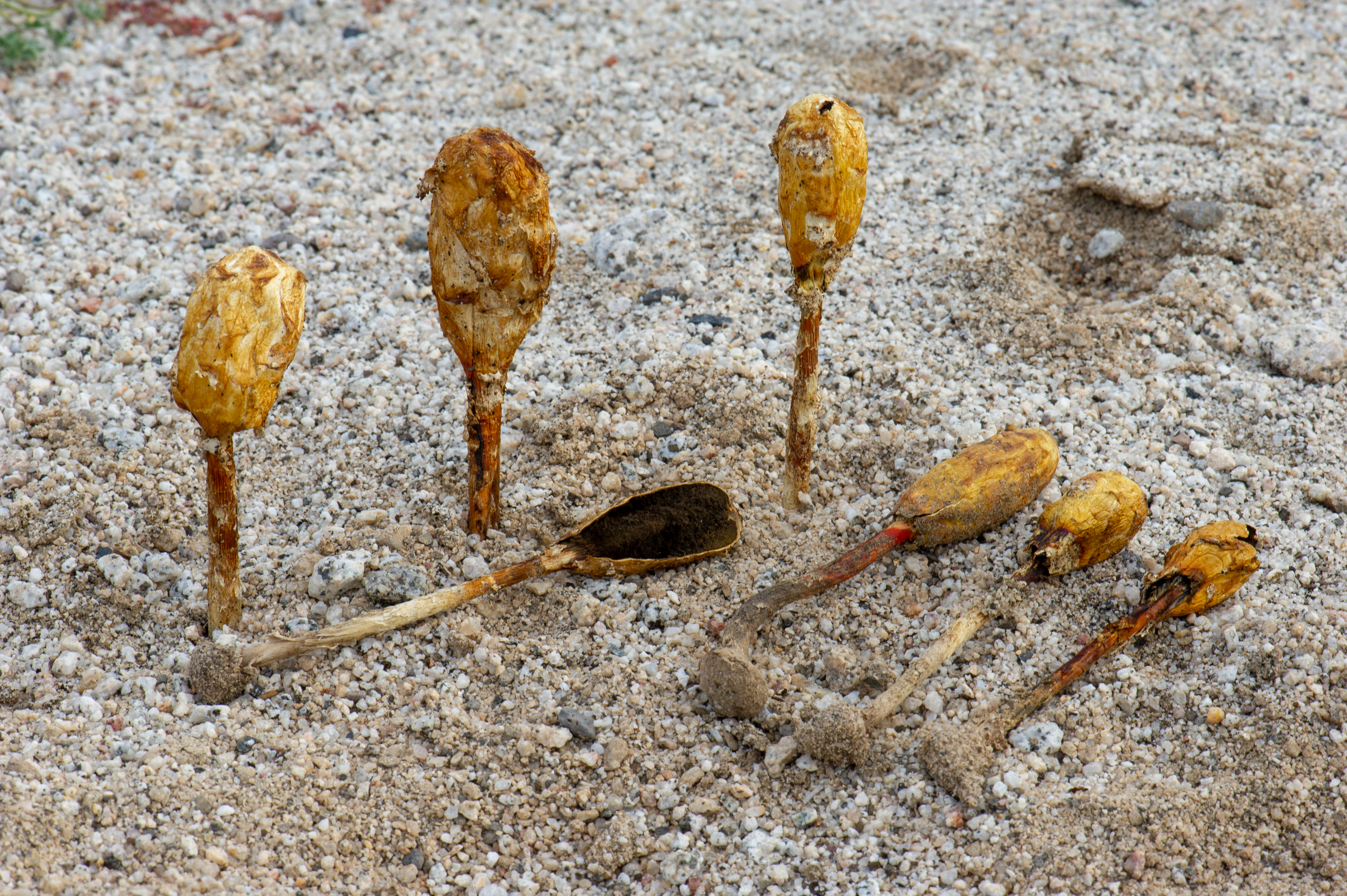

Scientific classification
- Kingdom: Fungi
- Division: Basidiomycota
- Class: Agaricomycetes
- Order: Agaricales
- Family: Agaricaceae
- Genus: Podaxis
- Species: P. pistillaris

Binomial name
- Podaxis pistillaris (L.) Fr. (as "Podaxon")

= Podaxis pistillaris =

Species of fungus

Podaxis pistillaris
- Mycological characteristics
- Gills on hymenium
- Cap is conical
- Hymenium is seceding
- Stipe has a ring
- Spore print is buff to reddish-brown
- Ecology is saprotrophic
- Edibility is edible or inedible

Podaxis pistillaris is a xerophilic agaric mushroom related to the puffballs and inkcaps. It is commonly known as the desert shaggy mane. The cap grows to 11 cm tall and thrives in deserts and semi-deserts of North America, Australia, and South Africa.

== Taxonomy ==
Older synonyms for this species include Lycoperdon pistillare L. (1771) and Scleroderma pistillare (L.) Pers. (1801).

The species' common name stems from its superficial resemblance to the shaggy mane, Coprinus comatus, the deliquescing gills of which it lacks.

It is an agaric, though it has lost hymenophoral organization and the ability to forcibly discharge its spores and become "secotioid". Although considered by many to be a "stalked puffball", P. pistillaris is more closely allied with the shaggy mane (Coprinus comatus) than with puffballs.

== Description ==
The pileus is a pod that grows up to 11 centimetres (4 1/4 in) tall. It has a hard, woody stem. The large cap, which protects the blackish spore-bearing tissue, forms scales and splits; it usually falls away at maturity, allowing the spores to be dispersed by wind.

The spore print is dark brown to black, if obtainable.

The spores are usually 10–14 (–16) by (8–) 9–12 μm, broadly oval to sub-globose, smooth yellow to deep reddish-brown with a double wall, truncate base, and apical pore. Older spore measurements have varied considerably. Species from Australian collections appear to be more subglobose than those seen from the United States, raising the possibility that the latter are not the same species.

=== Similar species ===
Some less common species in the genus appear very similar but the spores are smaller.

== Distribution and habitat ==
Large numbers may appear after soaking rains. It thrives in deserts and semi-deserts of Australia and North America. It is often found on termite mounds in South Africa. In Hawaii, it is frequently encountered along roadsides and in disturbed areas on the dry sides of the islands, especially in the Kona area of Hawaii and the Kihei area of Maui. David Arora reports its presence near the Taj Mahal in India.

== Uses ==
The species is not poisonous, but is not commonly eaten. It is said to be edible when young and still white inside. It is reportedly difficult to cultivate.

In Australia, it was used by many desert tribes to darken the white hair in old men's whiskers and for body painting. The fungus was presumably used by many desert Aboriginal peoples due to its distribution around drier areas of Australia. There are reports of its also being used as a fly repellent. Apart from the more common, ground-inhabiting P. pistillaris, there is one other Podaxis species in Australia, P. beringamensis, found on termite mounds; presumably both species were used.

Like many "puffballs", the species can be used to dye textiles, resulting in either a tan or a reddish hue. This requires an alkaline base, and many home dyers use ammonia. Urine was used in former times.
