= William Henry Long =

- Born: 7 March 1867; Navarro County, Texas
- Died: 10 December 1947 (aged 80); Painesville, Ohio
- Known for: Contributing to knowledge about rusts and wood rot fungi
- Scientific career
- Fields: mycologist, forest pathologist
- Doctoral advisor: George F. Atkinson
- Author abbrev. (botany): Long

William Henry "Doc" Long (7 March 1867 – 10 December 1947) was an American mycologist. He obtained his Bachelor degree at Baylor University in Waco, Texas in 1888, and then served as Professor of Natural Sciences at this university until 1892. Long entered graduate studies in 1899 under the supervision of W.L. Bray and W.M. Wheeler in 1899, and obtained a master's degree in 1900. For the following nine years he was Professor of Botany at North Texas State Normal College at Denton. Under the guidance of George F. Atkinson, Long performed field work at Cornell University, which eventually led to a PhD degree awarded from the University of Texas in 1917. His specialty was on tree rusts and wood rotting fungi. In the early 1900s, he worked as a forest pathologist in the Sandia Mountains in central New Mexico, conducting pioneering research into tree diseases. He lived there in a log cabin at what is today the "furthest set" pavilion at the Doc Long Picnic Site in the Sandias.
