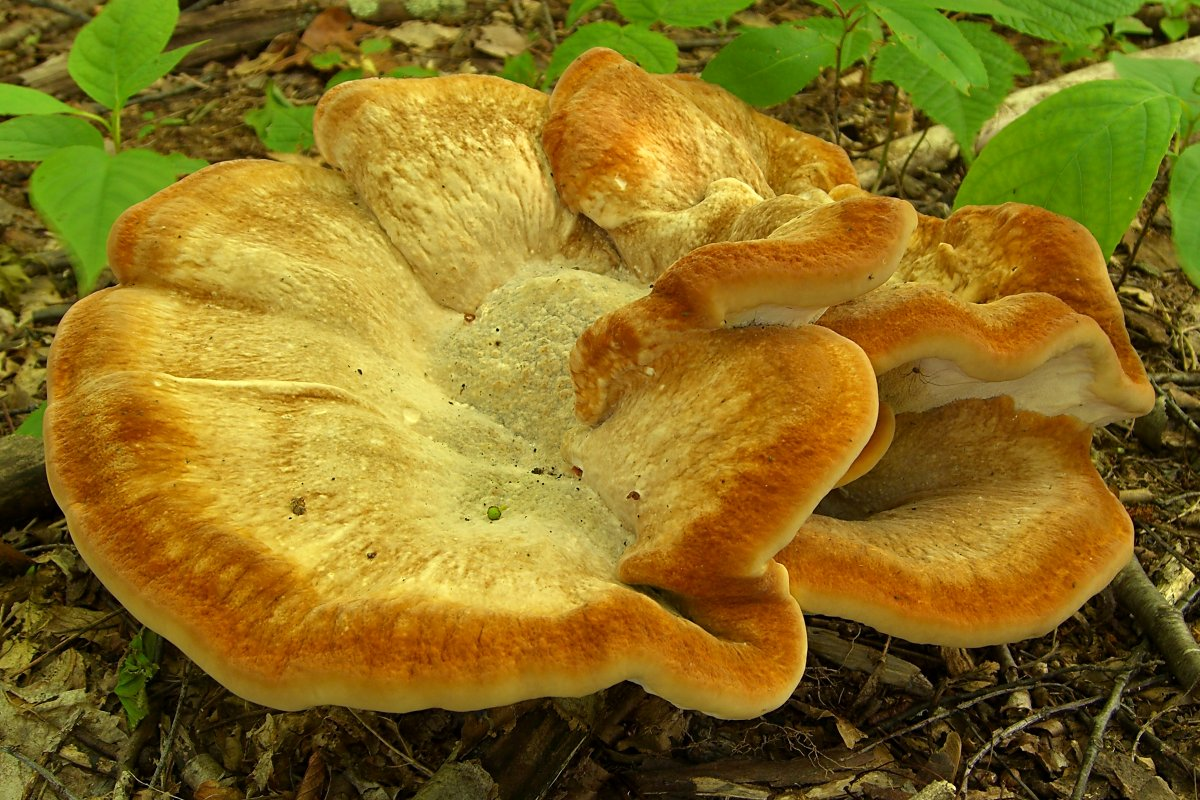
- Bondarzewia montana

Scientific classification
- Kingdom: Fungi
- Division: Basidiomycota
- Class: Agaricomycetes
- Order: Russulales
- Family: Bondarzewiaceae; Kotl. & Pouzar (1957)

Type genus
- Bondarzewia Singer (1940)

Genera
- Amylaria; Amylosporus; Bondarzewia; Gloiodon; Heterobasidion; Spiniger; Stecchericium; Wrightoporia

Synonyms
- Echinodontiaceae Donk (1961); Amylariaceae Corner (1970); Heterobasidiaceae Jülich (1981)

= Bondarzewiaceae =

Family of fungi

The Bondarzewiaceae are a family of fungi in the order Russulales. The type species for both its genus and the family as a whole, Bondarzewia montana, closely resembles members of Polyporales (and was formerly placed there), but has ornamented spores like those of Lactarius or Russula. This characteristic suggested the relationship between physically dissimilar species that eventually led to the restructuring of Russulales (and other taxa) using molecular phylogeny. According to the Dictionary of the Fungi (10th edition, 2008), the family contains 8 genera and 48 species.

The taxon is named after Russian mycologist Apollinari Semyonovich Bondarzew.
