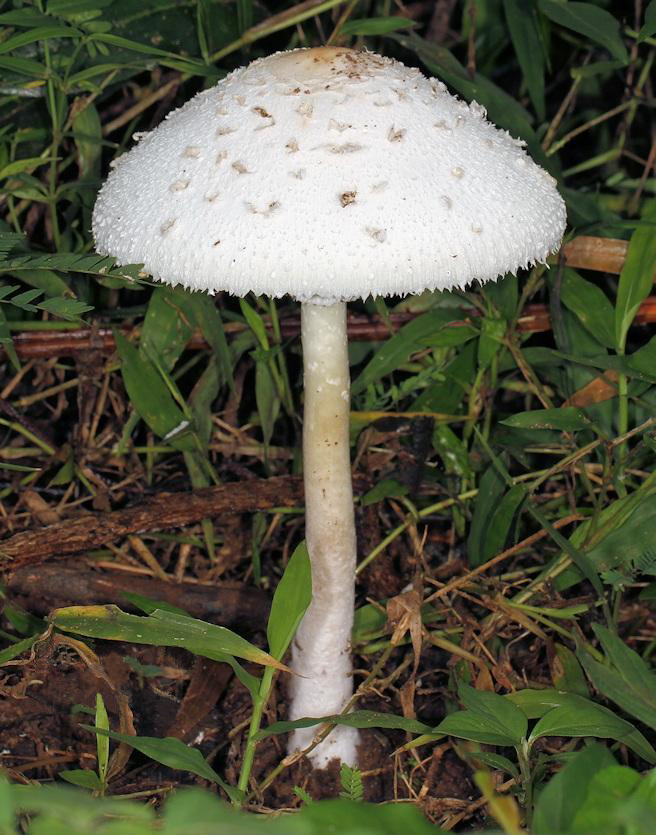

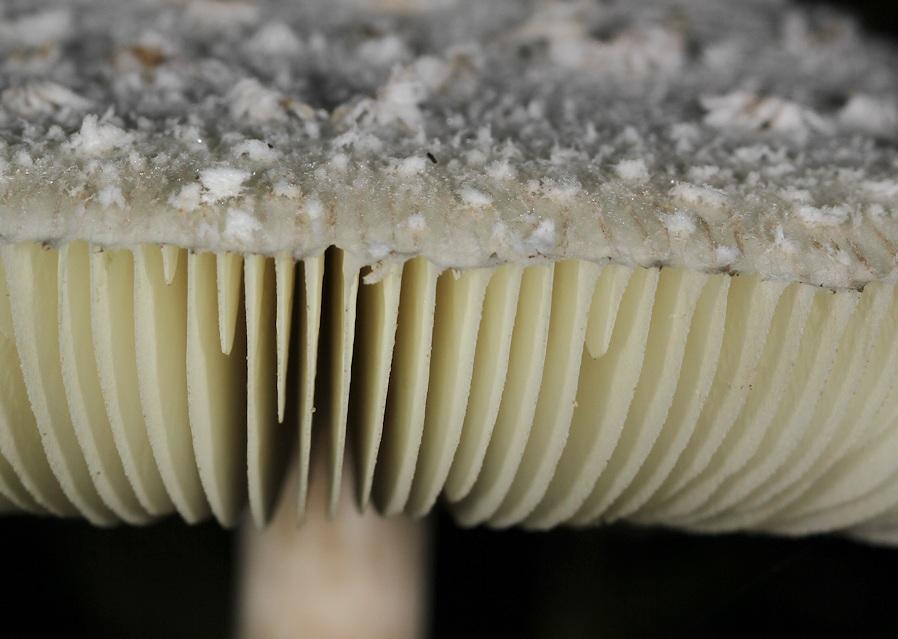
- Gill details

Scientific classification
- Kingdom: Fungi
- Division: Basidiomycota
- Class: Agaricomycetes
- Order: Agaricales
- Family: Agaricaceae
- Genus: Macrolepiota
- Species: M. zeyheri

Binomial name
- Macrolepiota zeyheri (Berk.) Singer (1962)

Synonyms
- Agaricus zeyheri Berk. (1843); Lepiota zeyheri Sacc. (1887); Mastocephalus zeyheri Kuntze (1891); Lepiota elegantula Sacc. (1877); Lepiota zeyheri var. verrucellosus Miq. (1852); Lepiota zeyheri var. telosus Kalchbr. & MacOwan (1881); Lepiota zeyheri var. elegantula Sacc. (1887); Leucocoprinus zeyheri Singer (1943)

= Macrolepiota zeyheri =

Species of fungus

Macrolepiota zeyheri
- Mycological characteristics
- Gills on hymenium
- Cap is convex
- Hymenium is free
- Stipe has a ring
- Spore print is pink to white
- Ecology is saprotrophic
- Edibility is edible

Macrolepiota zeyheri is a species of mushroom producing fungus in the family Agaricaceae. In the Kilendu dialect it is known as djilo and in the Kilur dialect it is called n'volo mighom.

== Taxonomy ==
Macrolepiota zeyheri has a complicated taxonomic history due to a series of minor errors and confusions in its classifications and published names.

It was first described in 1843 by the British mycologist Miles Joseph Berkeley who classified it as Agaricus zeyheri or Agaricus (Lepiota) zeyheri.

In 1848 the Swedish mycologist Elias Magnus Fries suggested that the species should be split into two based on the description he provided of differences between specimens he studied and the one originally described by Berkeley.

"This species from the Rev. Berkeley, having already been fully described, of which we have seen numerous and well-preserved specimens, we propose again for the sake of the two affines to be described below."

— Elias Fries, Fungi Natalenses, (translated from Latin)

Fries however did not suggest a name for this proposed species but in 1962 the German mycologist Rolf Singer classified it as Macrolepiota zeyheri and cited Fries as the original authority. This created an illegitimate name since Agaricus zeyheri had in fact been originally classified by Berkeley. The specific epithet zeyheri is named for the explorer and botanist who embarked on the South African expedition in which the first specimens of A. zeyheri were collected. As his name was given as M. Zeyher and since many plant and fungi species are named for him, this has the potential to cause errors in modern optical character recognition when applied to scanned historical texts. Since so many species are named for him this can also create confusion with abbreviated species names, for instance L. zeyheri could refer to Lepiota zeyheri, Leucocoprinus zeyheri or Lentinus zeyheri.

In his Sydowia paper, Singer used the author abbreviation 'Sing.' for himself rather than standard form recognised today of 'Singer'. This may present issues for automated systems designed to look for author citations in scanned documents and check them against the list of recognised names. In 1969 the Belgian mycologist Paul Heinemann discussed Macrolepiota zeyheri in his paper entitled 'Le genre Macrolepiota Sing. (Leucocoprineae) au Congo-Kinshasa' however not only did he also use the Sing. abbreviation but he cited the wrong date for the Sydowia journal in which it was published. The citation which Heinemann used was 'Macrolepiota zeyheri (Berk.) Sing., Sydowia, 15: 67 (1952)' however volume 15 of Sydowia was published in 1962. These cascading issues have resulted in some sources citing Heinemann as the authority on the species with a citation to Sydowia, which he did not write in.

In 1887 Agaricus zeyheri (Berk.) was reclassified as Lepiota zeyheri by the Italian mycologist Pier Andrea Saccardo who also reclassified his Lepiota elegantula as a variant of it in the same year.

In 1891 it was classified as Mastocephalus zeyheri by the German botanist Otto Kunze in his extensive proposed list of reclassifications. However no species remain within this genus.

In 1943 it was reclassified as Leucocoprinus zeyheri by the German mycologist Rolf Singer and so in many sources Leucocoprinus zeyheri remained as a recognised species separately from Macrolepiota zeyheri. Heinemann's 1969 description of the species however does list Leucocoprinus zeyheri as a synonym.

=== Variants ===
In 1852 the Dutch botanist Friedrich Anton Wilhelm Miquel described Agaricus (Lepiota) verrucellosus which he noted was very warty or scaly towards the umbo or centre disc. He stated that Elias Magnus Fries' 1838 classification of Agaricus clypeolari was a related species.

In 1881 the Hungarian mycologist Károly Kalchbrenner and Peter MacOwan proposed the variant Agaricus (Lepiota) zeyheri var. telosus.

In 1887 Pier Andrea Saccardo classified Agaricus verrucellosus as Lepiota zeyheri var. verrucellosus, whilst also recognising L. zeyheri var. telosa and describing L. zeyheri var. elegantula.

== Description ==
=== Historic ===
Berkeley described Agaricus (Lepiota) zeyheri as follows:

Cap: Around 15 cm wide, expanded with a wide umbo in the centre. The cap surface is white and smooth at the cap edges but cracking towards the centre whilst the umbo is brown with small warts. Gills: Free, broad and tan coloured from the spores but with colourless flesh when examined under a light. Stem: Around 18 cm tall and 2 cm thick running up into the flesh of the cap. Smooth and white and roughly equal in thickness across its length but with a bulbous base that is up to 4 cm thick. The stem is hollow but with slightly fibrous interior flesh. The persistent but movable stem ring is thick and large with membranous edges.

This description seems to describe a Chlorophyllum or Macrolepiota species as suggested by the large size of the cap and stem, the thick, movable stem ring and the smooth stem surface. Indeed, Berk notes that the species is closely related to Agaricus procerus which is now known as Macrolepiota procera with some of the former variants being reclassified as Chlorophyllum rhacodes and Macrolepiota excoriata.

Saccardo describes L. zeyheri var. telosa as being 'equally spectacular' and notes large scales with brown lacerations with cobweb like formations on the cap. The colour is described as yellowish white or possibly white discolouring to yellow. L. zeyheri var. verrucellosa is described as being smaller than L. zeyheri with a slender white stem and bulbous base. The cap is described as umbonate and dotted with warts or brown scales. L. zeyheri var. elegantula is described as having reddish brown scales on the cap with a slender stem.

These likewise all sound like descriptions of Macrolepiota or Chlorophyllum species and since Singer classified Agaricus zeyheri (Fr.) as a Macrolepiota species it seems possible that Leucocoprinus zeyheri may simply be misclassified and no longer placed within the Leucocoprinus genus.

=== Recent ===
Paul Heinemann's 1969 description of Macrolepiota zeyheri is perhaps the most detailed, recent and authoritative given his extensive work with genera such as Lepiota, Leucocoprinus and Macrolepiota.

Cap: 10–16 cm wide, starting conical before rounding out and ultimately becoming convex with a prominent, raised central disc. The surface is light brown with an ochre centre when young but as it matures the cap becomes white with light brown scales and granulations whilst the centre remains ochre or yellowish brown. The cap edges are irregular and fluffy with remnants of the white veil. The flesh of the cap is white and does not change colour with age though the consistency does change with it starting firm before becoming soft and tinder dry. It is 8-10mm thick in the midpoint between the centre and the edge. Gills: Free with a collar and creamy white or whitish yellow discolouring pinkish with age. The gill spacing is very wide and can be up to 23mm and the edges are unequal and slightly crenelated. Stem: 11–21 cm tall, 8-13mm thick and cylindrical running down to a 25-35mm somewhat bulbous base. The hollow stem runs deep into the flesh of the cap and has a white surface which discolours pinkish brown with age or contact. It is covered with a slightly woolly (tomentose) or scaly (furfuraceous) coating which is more pronounced at the base. The double stem ring is movable with a fibrous or scaly upper surface and smooth lower rim. The stem flesh is white and fibrous discolouring ochre with age. Spore print: Pinkish white. Spores: Ellipsoid with a large pore. 12.5-15 x 9-10.4 μm. Smell: Pleasant. Taste: Pleasant. Conversely, in 1950 Arthur Anselm Pearson described Lepiota zeyheri as tasting mild but 'rather rancid'.

The cap dries to creamy with brown scales and centre, the gills to ochre and the stem to yellowish grey.

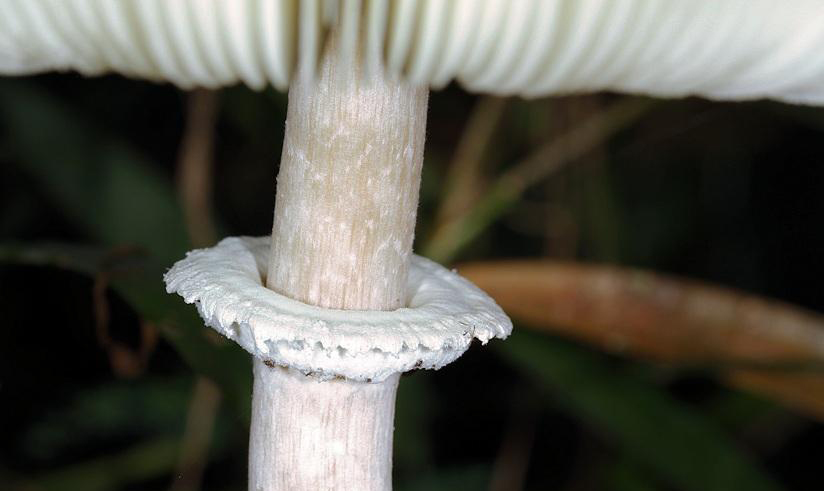
Macrolepiota zeyheri stem ring details

== Habitat and distribution ==
The specimens studied by Berkeley were collected from an expedition into South Africa and Heinemann studied specimens gathered from all over the Democratic Republic of Congo. Specimens were collected in Kisantu in the South West, Lake Albert in the North East, Lake Edward and Lake Kivu in the East and Lubumbashi in the far south suggesting a widespread distribution.

A study in 2020 documented Macrolepiota zeyheri in South Africa but also lists Leucoagaricus zeyheri, apparently erroneously.

GBIF records observations in the Congo and many more across South Africa.

== Edibility ==
Macrolepiota zeyheri is reported to be an edible species however Heinemann notes that it was not consumed by the natives.

== Etymology ==
Agaricus zeyheri was named for M. Zeyher, the African traveller and botanist who collected numerous specimens of various species on his expedition to the North interior of South Africa which began in November 1839. Zeyher was accompanied by Mr Burke who was a gardener in the employ of the 14th Earl of Derby, who funded the expedition entirely. The success of this expedition is perhaps best documented by the vast number of species which are named for Zeyher.

== Similar species ==
- Macrolepiota mastoidea is described as looking extremely similar although its distribution is more typically European. M. zeyheri may be distinguished from it by its very wide gills which develop a pinkish colour with age however confusion is possible as the microscopic details are similar with only small difference between the size and shape of the spores.
