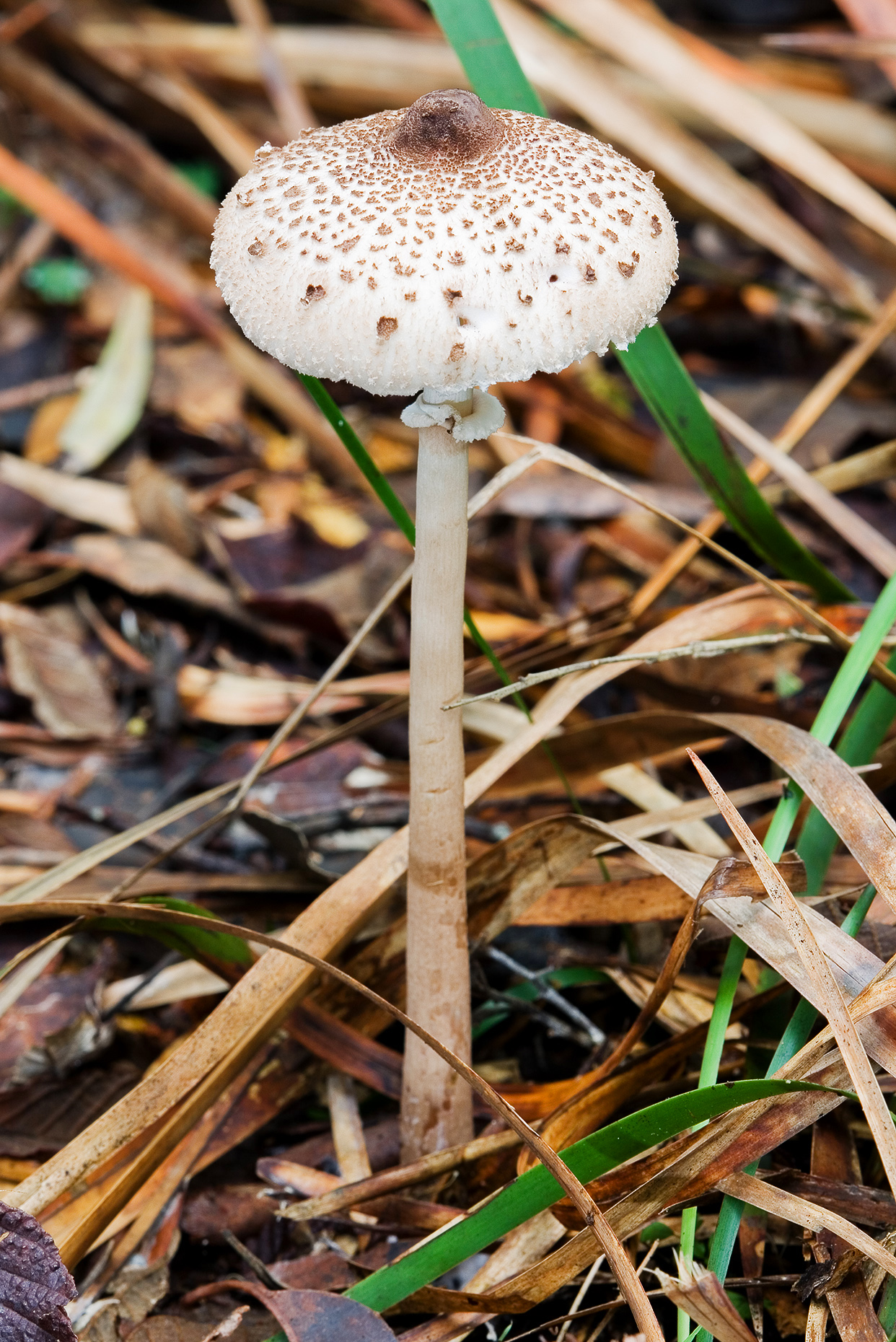

Scientific classification
- Kingdom: Fungi
- Division: Basidiomycota
- Class: Agaricomycetes
- Order: Agaricales
- Family: Agaricaceae
- Genus: Macrolepiota
- Species: M. clelandii

Binomial name
- Macrolepiota clelandii Grgur. (1997)

= Macrolepiota clelandii =

Species of mushroom-forming fungus

Macrolepiota clelandii, commonly known as the slender parasol or graceful parasol, is a species of mushroom-forming fungus in the family Agaricaceae. The species is found in Australia and New Zealand, where it fruits singly or in small groups on the ground in eucalypt woodlands, parks, and roadsides. It is a tall mushroom up to roughly 20 cm (8 in), with a broad cap covered with distinctive rings of dark brown scales. The whitish gills on the cap underside are closely spaced and free from attachment to the slender stipe, which has a loose ring on its upper half, and a bulbous base. The edibility of the mushroom is not known with certainty, but closely related parasol mushrooms are edible and some are very sought after.

The fungus, first documented by naturalist John Burton Cleland in the early 20th century, was initially assumed to be the close relative Macrolepiota procera, a European species now known to be absent from Australia. Australian mycologist Cheryl Grgurinovic recognized Cleland's collections as a distinct species, officially describing it in 1997. The fungus has been referred to by several names: M. konradii, M. gracilenta, and M. mastoidea. Else Vellinga showed using molecular phylogenetic analysis that these names refer to European species and were misapplied by Australian authors.

== Taxonomy ==
Macrolepiota clelandii was officially described by mycologist Cheryl Grgurinovic in her 1997 work Larger Fungi of South Australia. Before this, Australian naturalist John Burton Cleland had referred the fungus to Macrolepiota procera, a widespread, common species that is now known to not occur in Australia. Grgurinovic identified Cleland's taxon, characterised by having two-spored basidia, as a distinct species. The type collection was made by Cleland in 1912, near Hawkesbury River in New South Wales. The specific epithet clelandii honours Cleland's early work in documenting the species several times in the early 20th century. The mushroom is commonly called the slender or graceful parasol fungus. "Bush parasol" is a proposed common name for use in New Zealand.

Molecular analysis of DNA sequences from Australian collections labeled Macrolepiota konradii, M. gracilenta, M. mastoidea, and M. procera has shown that they are the same species as Macrolepiota clelandii. Similarly, several New Zealand collections were historically misidentified as Macrolepiota dolichaula. These names, given originally to European species, were erroneously applied to Australian collections. Else Vellinga subsequently emended the species concept of Macrolepiota clelandii to include specimens with four-spored basidia and pale fruitbody colouring. Phylogenetically, M. clelandii is in a clade with closely related species such as M. procera, M. dolichaula, and M. mastoidea. This clade is sister to a group containing Leucoagaricus and Leucocoprinus species. The presence of clamp connections in the hyphae place M. clelandii in the section Macrolepiota of genus Macrolepiota.

== Description ==
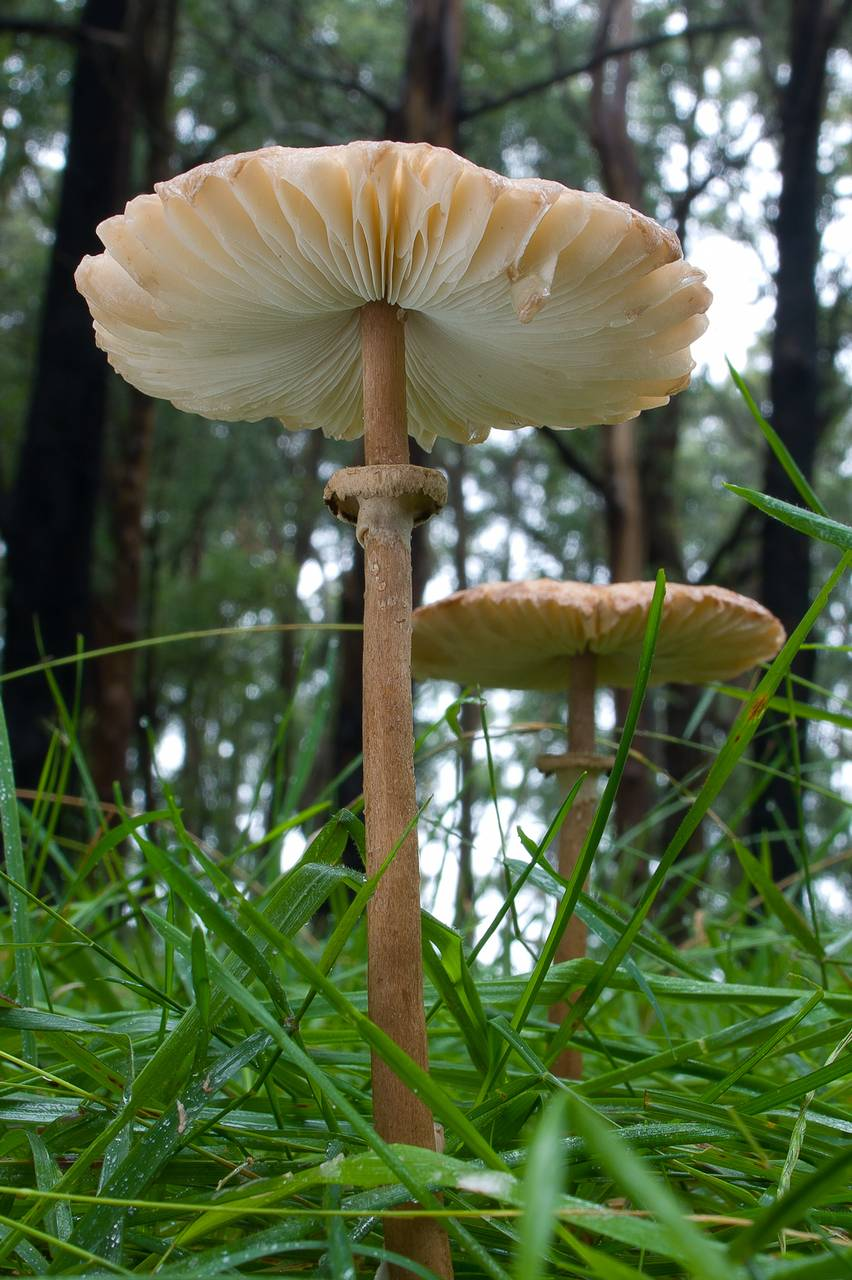
In Dandenong Ranges National Park, Victoria

The fruitbody of Macrolepiota clelandii has a cap that is initially egg-shaped, later becoming convex and then flattened in maturity, reaching diameters of 7.6–12.5 cm (3.0–4.9 in). It has a dark brown umbo and small dark brown scales that show the whitish flesh underneath. These scales are arranged in concentric rings that become increasingly crowded until the umbo, which is completely covered in scales. Small fragments of the partial veil may be left hanging on the cap margin.

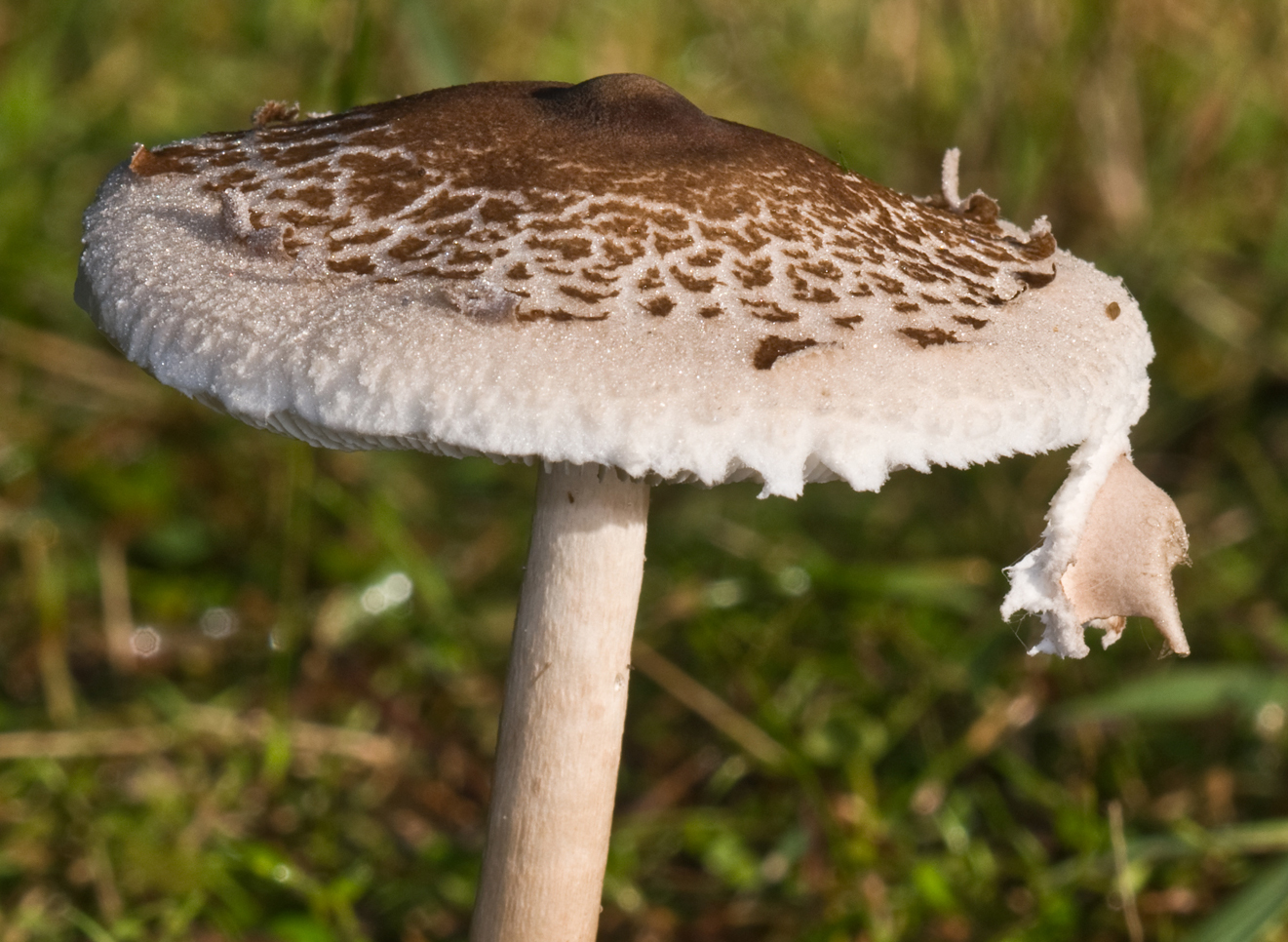
Fragments of the partial veil may remain hanging on the cap margin.

The white gills are free from attachment to the stipe and closely spaced. The slender, hollow stipe measures up to 18.7 cm (7.4 in) long, and has a somewhat bulbous base. It has a pale brown colour, and features a ring on its upper half that often detaches to become freely movable up and down the stipe. The mushrooms have no distinctive odour. Its tall stature means the gills are usually clean, having avoided rain splash from the forest floor.

According to Peter Roberts and Shelley Evans, all "parasol" species (i.e., M. procera and its close relatives, including M. clelandii) are edible. Anthony M. Young notes the similarity of M. clelandii to the edible European species M. konradii, but warns "the toxicity of the Australian species is unknown."

Macrolepiota clelandii produces a white spore print. Individual spores are ellipsoid with a small germ pore, smooth, thick-walled, and measure 13.4–24.8 by 9.6–16.0 μm. They have a dextrinoid staining reaction (reddish-brown) with Melzer's reagent. The basidia (spore-bearing cells) are club-shaped, measuring 38.0–50 by 10.2–13.6 μm. They are two-, three-, or four-spored, with sterigmata up to 8.0 μm long. Collections with predominantly four-spored basidia will generally have smaller spores than those with two-spored basidia. Two-spored basidia produce spores with four nuclei. Cheilocystidia are plentiful on the edge of the gill. They have dimensions of 24.8–42.4 by 7.2–10.4 μm, with a cylindrical to club shape. There are no cystidia on the gill face (pleurocystidia). Clamp connections are present in the hyphae.

=== Similar species ===
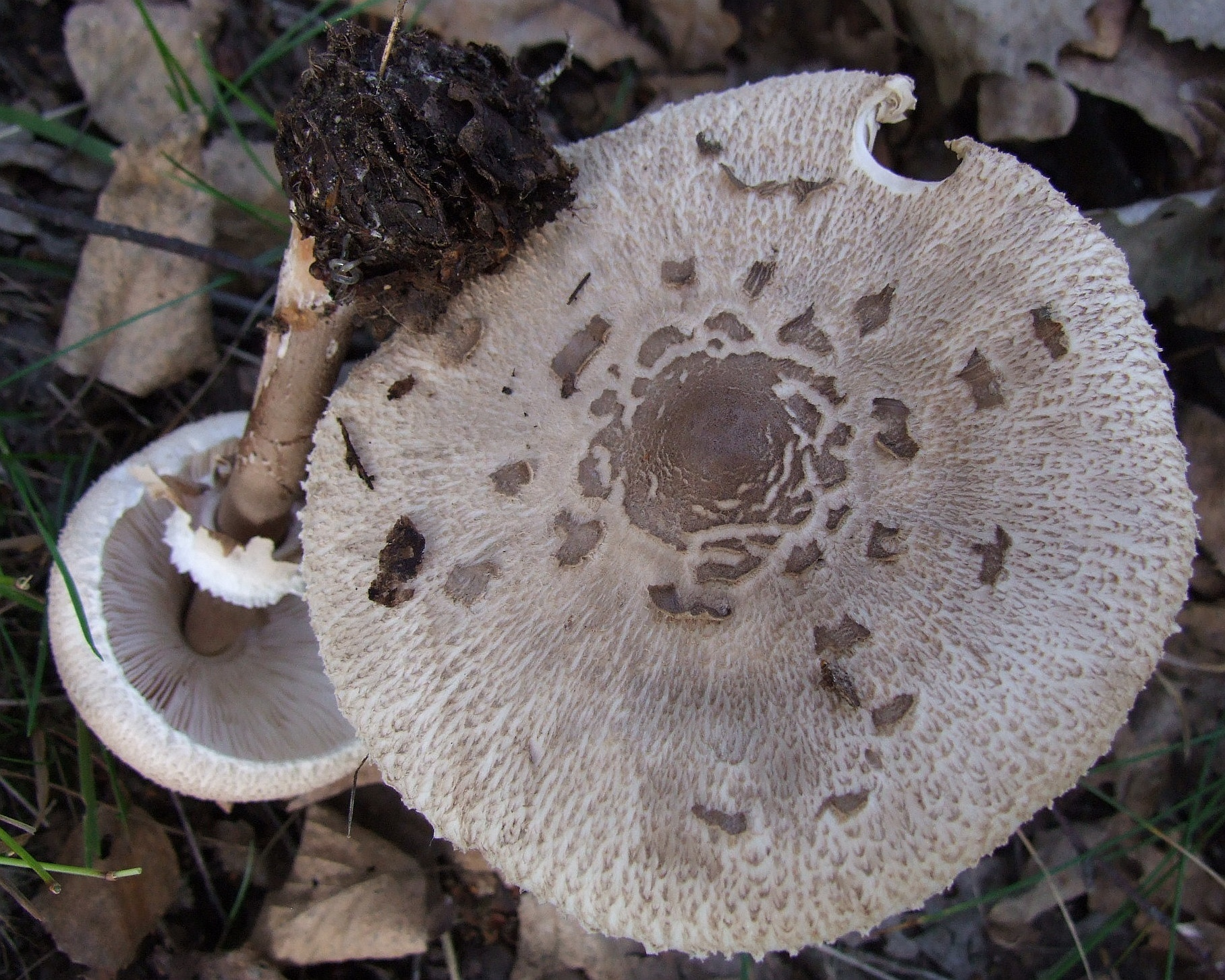
Macrolepiota konradii

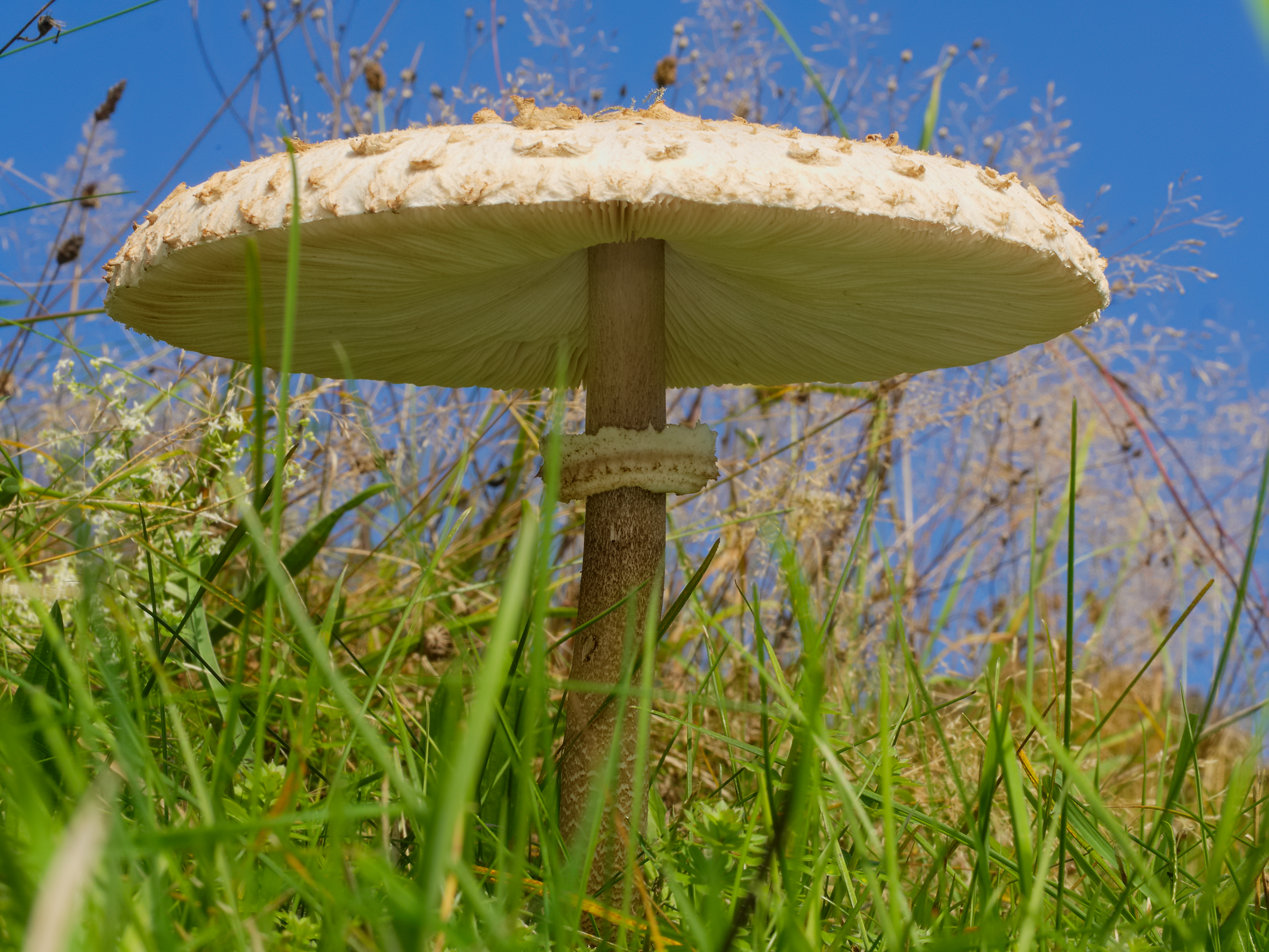
Macrolepiota procera

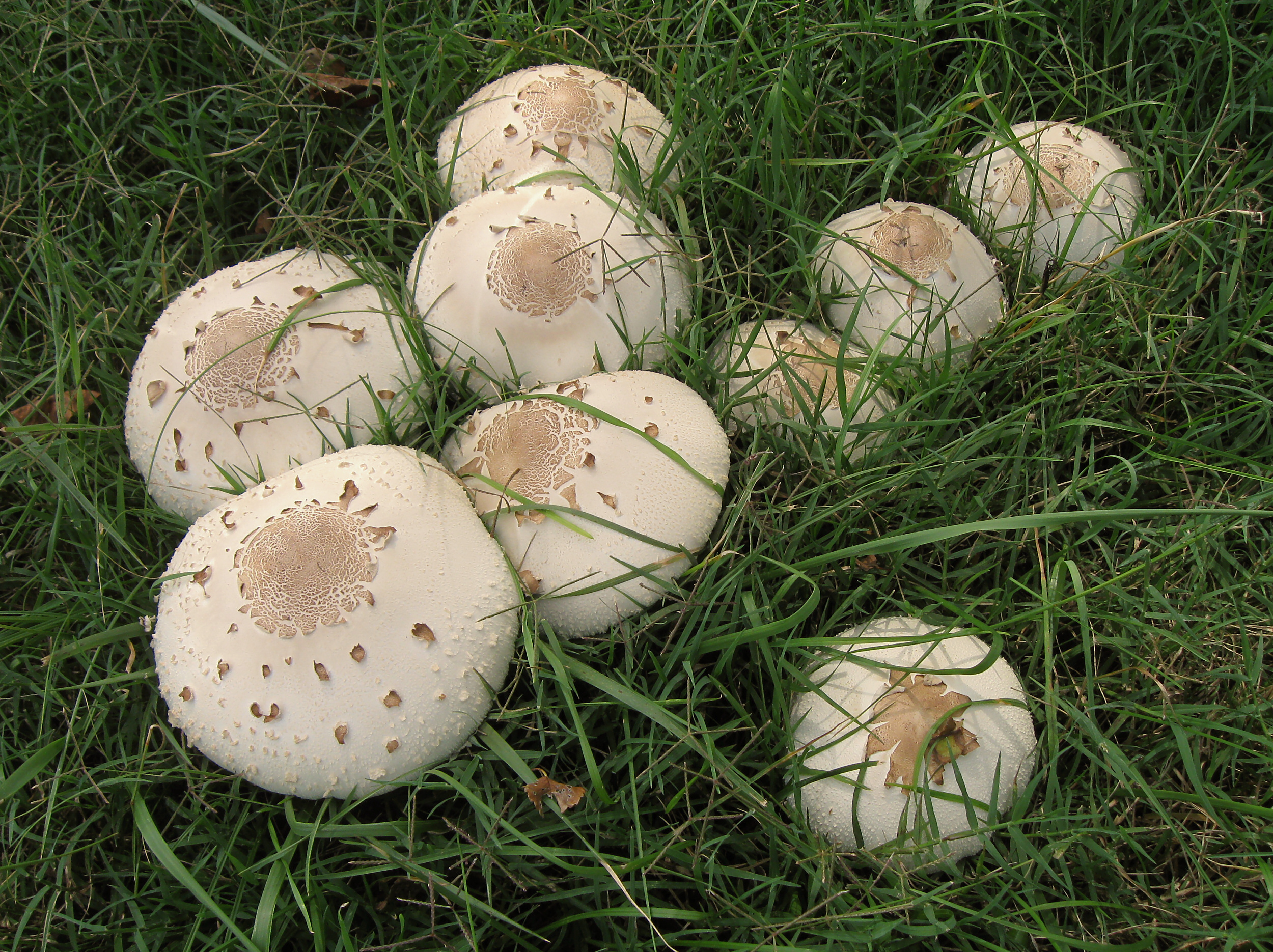
Chlorophyllum molybdites

Lookalikes

The European species Macrolepiota konradii, similar in appearance to M. clelandii, has a smaller range of spore dimensions, typically 13–17 by 8–10 μm. M. subcitrophylla, described from China in 2012, is genetically close to M. clelandii. Unlike the latter species, it has yellow gills. M. procera is a larger with broad caps up to 12 in (30 cm) in diameter, and the stipe surface is covered with brownish zigzag bands or scaly girdles on a whitish background. Its spores are smaller than those of M. konradii, measuring on average 13.8–15.7 μm. It is now known to occur only in Europe.

The "false parasol", Chlorophyllum molybdites, a toxic species that can be mistaken for M. konradii, also occurs in Australia (but not New Zealand). It can be distinguished by its green spore print and gills that turn light green in age. Some deadly poisonous Lepiota species have a similar pattern of scales on the cap, but their fruitbodies are smaller.

== Habitat and distribution ==
Macrolepiota clelandii fruits singly or in small groups on the ground in grass or among leaf litter. It is typically found in eucalypt forest and subtropical rainforests. It has been recorded from Queensland, New South Wales, Victoria, South Australia, and Western Australia. In southwest Australia it is found in jarrah (Eucalyptus marginata) and karri (Eucalyptus diversicolor) forests, where fruiting usually occurs in late autumn and early winter. The fungus appears to prefer disturbed ground, as it is often found at roadsides by forests, on lawns, grassy areas of parks, and among the slash of thinned karri regrowth forests. It is common in river red gum (Eucalyptus camaldulensis) woodlands. M. clelandii also occurs in New Zealand, where it is found in mixed mānuka (Leptospermum scoparium), kānuka (Kunzea ericoides), and kauri (Agathis) forest, and in conifer plantations. It is the smallest and most slender of the Macrolepiota species that occur there.
