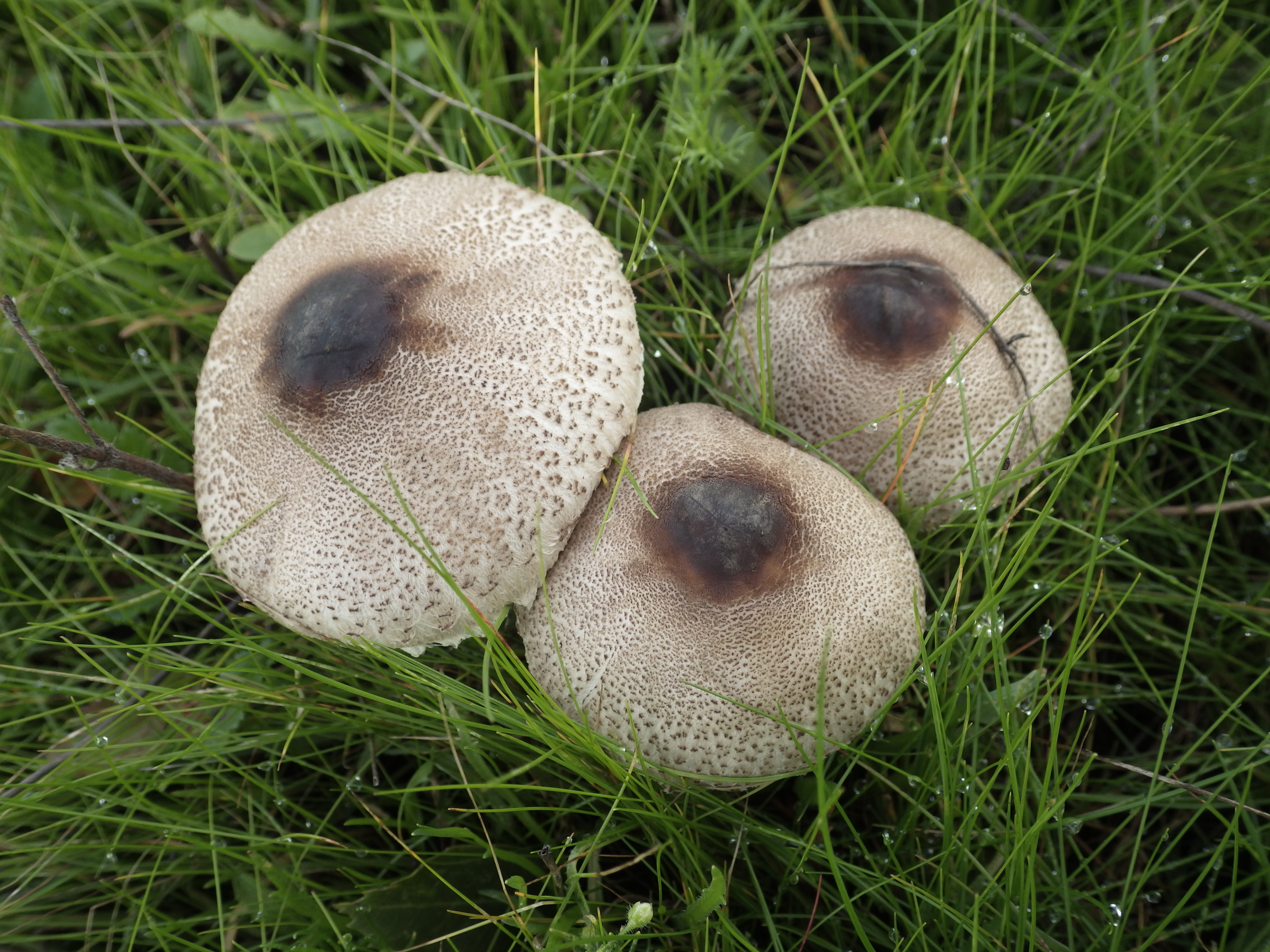

Scientific classification
- Domain: Eukaryota
- Kingdom: Fungi
- Division: Basidiomycota
- Class: Agaricomycetes
- Order: Agaricales
- Family: Agaricaceae
- Genus: Macrolepiota
- Species: M. phaeodisca

Binomial name
- Macrolepiota phaeodisca Bellù (1984)

= Macrolepiota phaeodisca =

Species of fungus

Macrolepiota phaeodisca is a species of mushroom in the family Agaricaceae. Found in southern Europe, it was described as new to science in 1984 by Italian naturalist Francisco Bellù. It is found in dune slacks, sandy pine plantations, and sometimes meadows. The specific epithet phaeodisca ("with a dusky disc"), refers to the dark central area of the cap.
