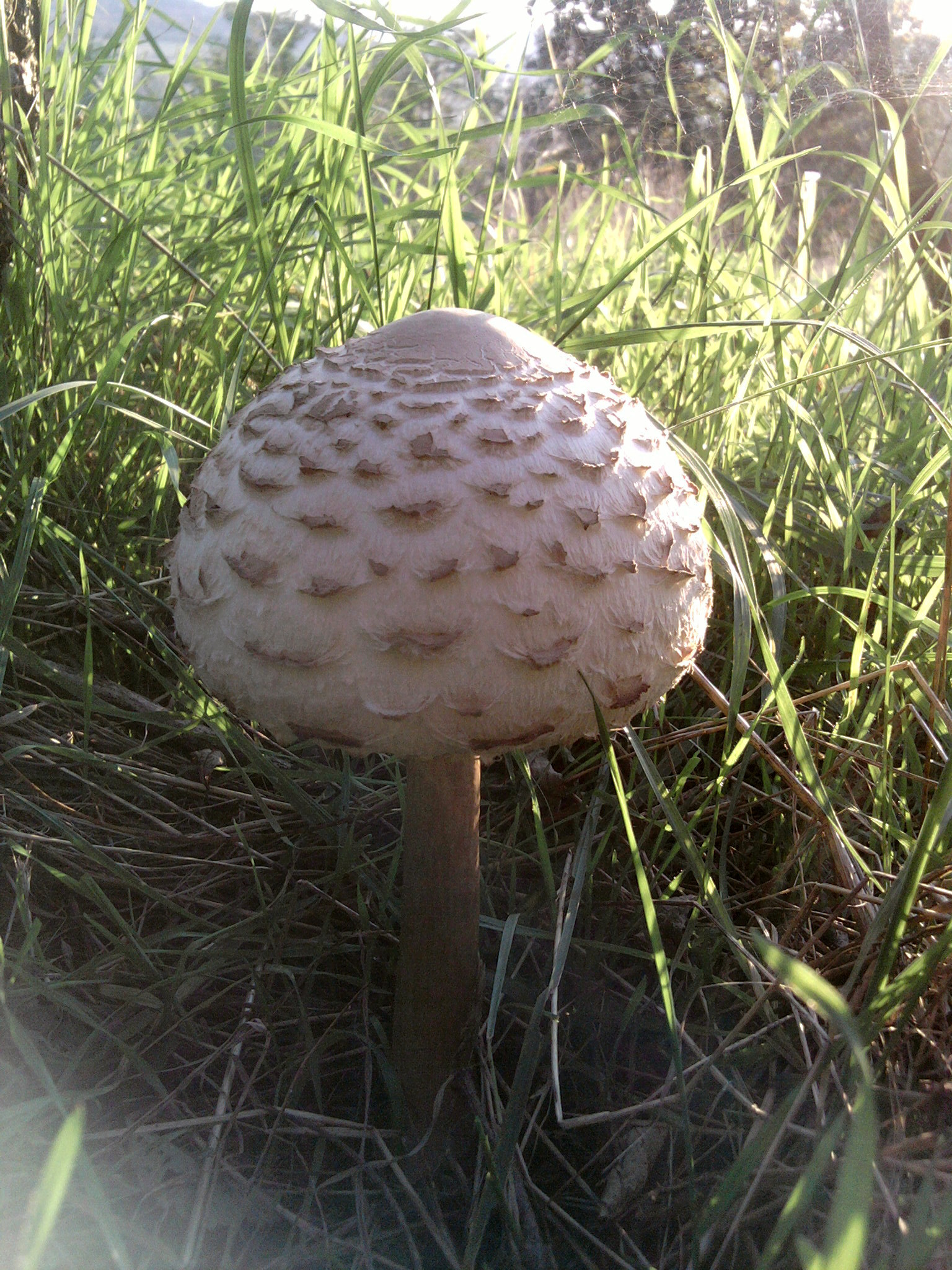

Scientific classification
- Kingdom: Fungi
- Division: Basidiomycota
- Class: Agaricomycetes
- Order: Agaricales
- Family: Agaricaceae
- Genus: Macrolepiota
- Species: M. excoriata

Binomial name
- Macrolepiota excoriata (Schaeff.) Wasser (1978)

Synonyms
- Agaricus excoriatus Schaeff. (1774)

= Macrolepiota excoriata =

Species of fungus

Macrolepiota excoriata is a mushroom in the family Agaricaceae.

== Description ==
The height is 5 to 15 cm (2.0 to 5.9 in). The color of the mushroom is white to cream. The cap is convex to shield shaped, is arched over with a raised center, 6 to 10 cm (2.4 to 3.9 in) in diameter, has a brownish center, and has ochre yellow to pale brown scales. The gills are white to cream. The stipe is smooth, cylindrical, has a bulbous base, and has a ring. The spores are smooth, hyaline, and ellipsoid. The spore print is white, cream, or yellowish. The ring is whitish to white. The flesh is white, fibrous, and does not change color. The mushroom is saprophytic. It is listed as a vulnerable species. The threat to this species is over-growing of ungrazed and unmowed meadows. The species is similar to Macrolepiota procera, although the latter is bigger.

== Edibility ==
The flesh is white, tender, and has a pleasant taste, best when it is consumed while it is young. The flesh tastes like hazelnut. The odor of the species is weak. The mushroom is similar to numerous toxic species so harvesting them is problematic. It has been advised by the website Memento des champignons (Memento of Fungus) to not collect specimens by roadsides. The collection period for the mushroom is from mid-summer to late autumn.

== Habitat ==
The mushroom can be found in North America and Europe and can be found on the ground, in fields, in lawns, or on roadsides. The species is common in Guernsey, even though most books say that it is rare in Guernsey.
