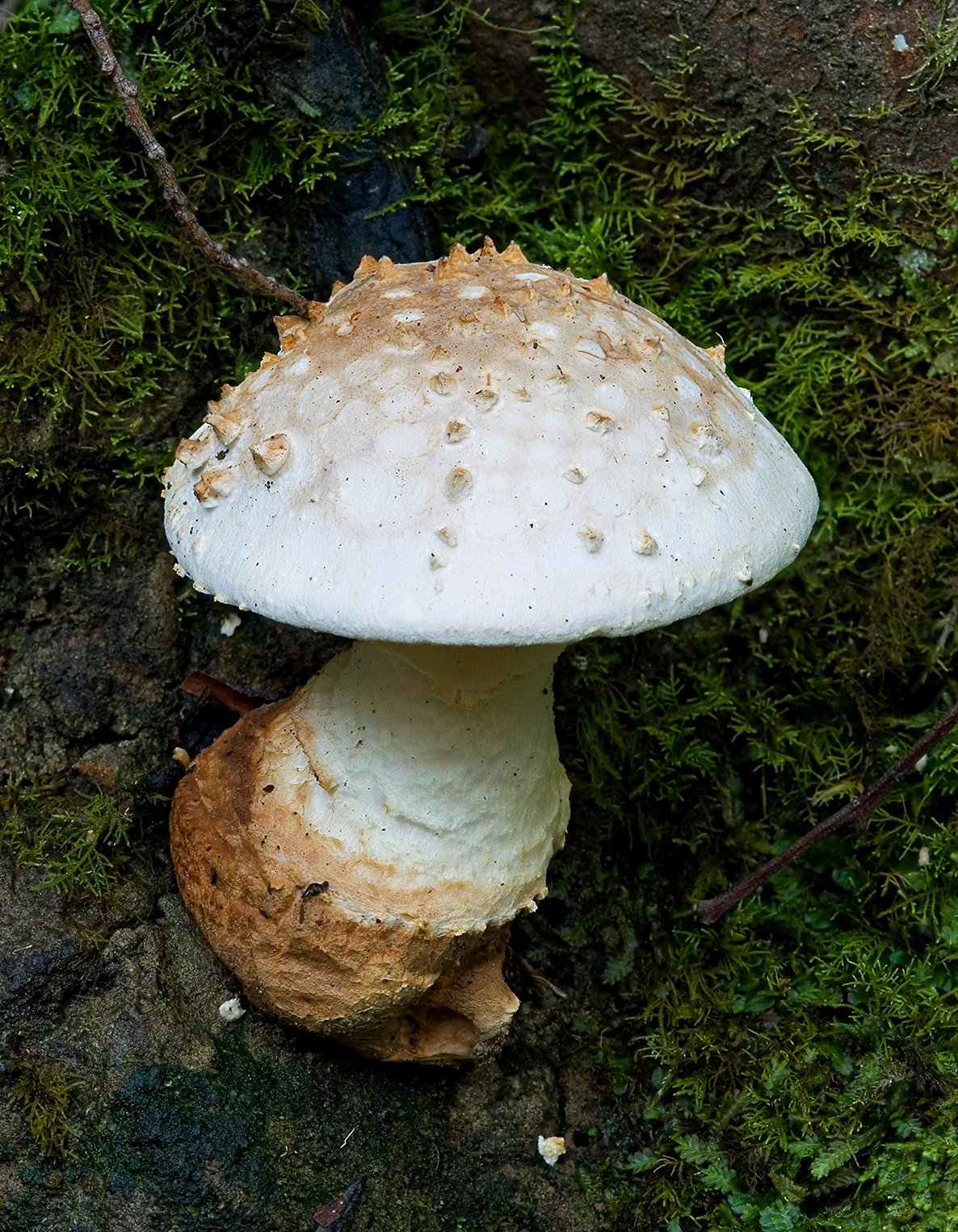
- Fruiting body, Mt Wellington, Tasmania

Scientific classification
- Domain: Eukaryota
- Kingdom: Fungi
- Division: Basidiomycota
- Class: Agaricomycetes
- Order: Agaricales
- Family: Amanitaceae
- Genus: Amanita
- Species: A. ochrophylloides

Binomial name
- Amanita ochrophylloides D. A. Reid

= Amanita ochrophylloides =

Pale-gilled barefoot lepidella

Species of fungus

Amanita ochrophylloides is a large mushroom of the genus Amanita native to southeastern Australia.

== Taxonomy ==
A. ochrophylloides was first described by Derek Reid, head mycologist of Kew Gardens, in 1978. He noted that this mushroom differed from the related A. ochrophylla in the shape of its spores, as well as the remnants of the membrane across the cap. The initial collection was of mushrooms growing on rocky black soil under peppermint gums and bracken at an altitude of 850 metres (2,790 feet), in Gippsland, southeast of the town of Matlock, Victoria.

== Description ==
The fruit body has a pale brown cap that is initially convex before flattening with maturity to almost flat or even depressed in the centre. It is covered in prominent small warts which are roughly cone-shaped. The gills are pale orange-yellow. The brownish-white stalk is up to 10 centimetres (4 inches) high and 2.6 cm (1 in) wide with a prominent bulb up to 4.5 cm (2 in) in diameter. The ring is off-white and prominent but may fall off older mushrooms. The globular spores are amyloid and measure 7–10 by 5–8 μm.

== See also ==
- List of Amanita species
