= Macrolepiota eucharis =

Scientific classification
- Kingdom: Fungi
- Division: Basidiomycota
- Class: Agaricomycetes
- Order: Agaricales
- Family: Agaricaceae
- Genus: Macrolepiota
- Species: M. eucharis

Binomial name
- Macrolepiota eucharis Vellinga & Halling (2003)

Species of fungus

Macrolepiota eucharis is a species of agaric fungus in the family Agaricaceae. It is found in Australia, where it grows under Eucalyptus grandis and Allocasuarina littoralis in rainforests. It was described as new to western science in 2003 by mycologists Else Vellinga and Roy Watling, from collections made in Queensland. The specific epithet derives from the Ancient Greek word ευχαρις, which means "charming, lovely, attractive". The small fruitbody of the fungus is characterised by dark grey to black cap, a volva at the base of the stipe, and microscopically by its small spores and narrowly club-shaped and cylindrical cheliocystidia.
