= Tapeigaster annulata =

Scientific classification
- Kingdom: Animalia
- Phylum: Arthropoda
- Clade: Pancrustacea
- Class: Insecta
- Order: Diptera
- Family: Heleomyzidae
- Genus: Tapeigaster
- Species: T. annulata

Binomial name
- Tapeigaster annulata Hendel, 1917

Synonyms
- Sciomyzoptera annulata Hendel, 1917; Tapeigaster fulva Malloch, 1926

Species of fly

Tapeigaster annulata is a species of fly in the family Heleomyzidae. It is endemic to Australia, occurring in coastal areas and the Tablelands regions in New South Wales, as well as the southeast of Queensland.

== Description ==
Adult T. annulata are flies measuring 5.5–7 mm (0.22–0.28 in) long. Its coloration is typically brighter orange than seen in T. digitata, the species to which it is most closely related. Its legs are thinner and shorter-haired than those of T. annulipes.

== Taxonomy and history ==
Austrian entomologist Friedrich Georg Hendel first described this species in 1917 as Sciomyzoptera annulata. The species was erroneously synonymized with T. annulipes by Mario Bezzi in 1923. It was later described by John Russell Malloch as Tapeigaster fulva in 1926. The names were combined as Tapeigaster annulata by David McAlpine and Deborah Kent in 1982.
