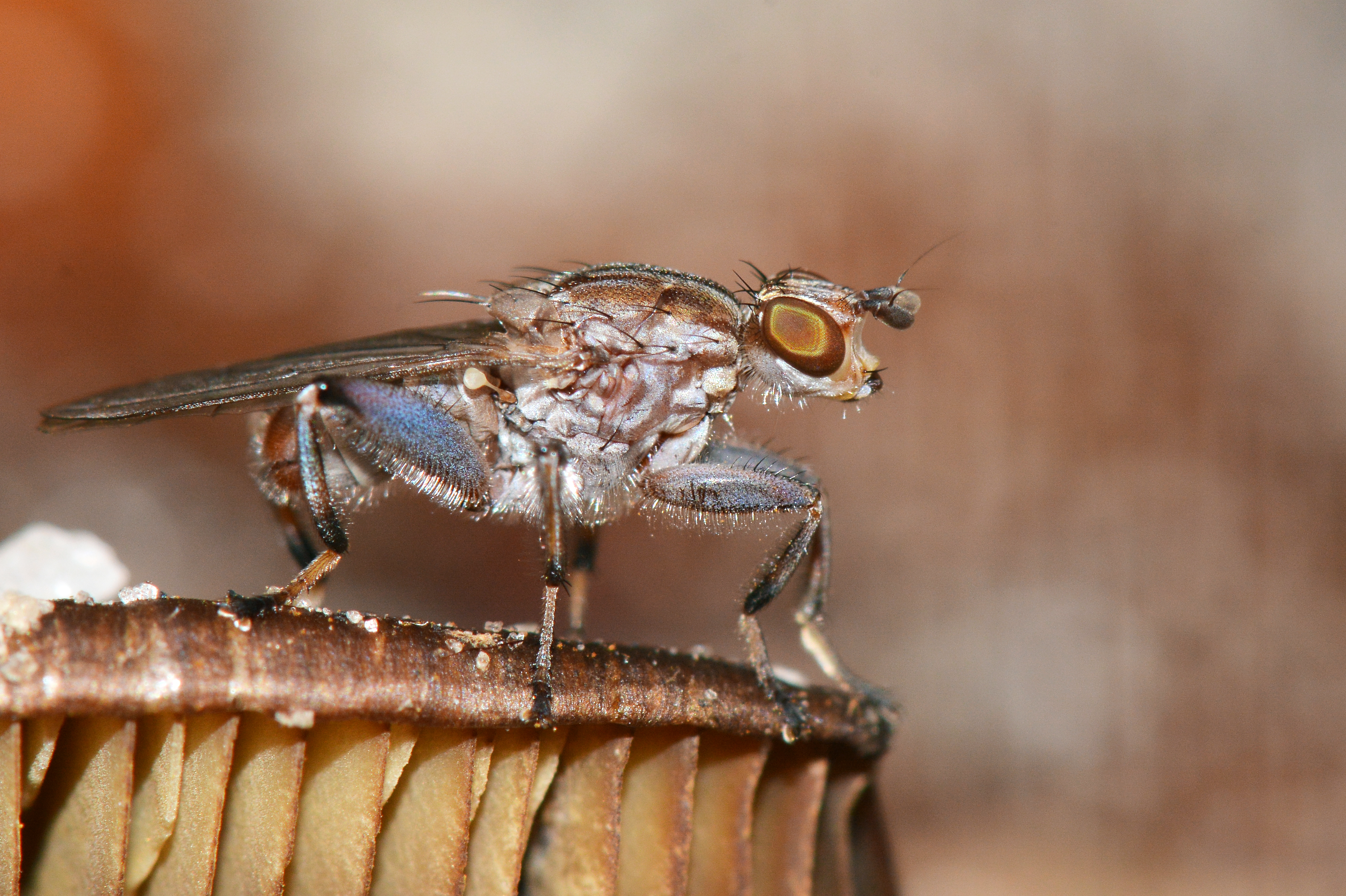
- Adult male photographed in Perth, Western Australia

Scientific classification
- Kingdom: Animalia
- Phylum: Arthropoda
- Clade: Pancrustacea
- Class: Insecta
- Order: Diptera
- Family: Heleomyzidae
- Genus: Tapeigaster
- Species: T. nigricornis

Binomial name
- Tapeigaster nigricornis Macquart, 1851

Synonyms
- Sciomyza nigricornis Macquart, 1851; Tapeigaster marginifrons Bezzi, 1923

= Tapeigaster nigricornis =

Species of fly

Tapeigaster nigricornis is a species of fly in the family Heleomyzidae. It is endemic to Australia, occurring in New South Wales, Queensland, South Australia, Tasmania, Victoria, and Western Australia. It is the most commonly seen species of Tapeigaster.

== Description ==
Adult T. nigricornis are medium-sized flies with bodies measuring 6 mm (0.24 in) long and wings measuring between 5–7 mm (0.20–0.28 in) long. The antennae are black, measuring slightly shorter than the face, with long, bare arista. All bristles on the head and thorax are black. The frons is yellow at the front of the head and red towards the back, with two bright white stripes bordering the eyes. The thorax is reddish-brown, with a grey longitudinal stripe running down the middle of the mesoscutum from the neck to the scutellum and a grey band running from near the neck to the base of the wing on each side. The halteres are white with a reddish stalk and the scutellum is reddish-brown with a dusting of grey. The femora are reddish but covered with a grey dust (pruinescence) that sometimes appears shiny. The fore and hind femora are moderately swollen, but the mid femora are not and appear visibly thinner. All femora have black bristles on the upper surface and a covering of white hairs below. The tibiae are yellowish, with the fore and mid tibiae darkening towards the tarsi while the hind tibiae are darkened at both ends. The tarsi are yellowish towards the tibia but become black towards the claws. The wings are transparent with reddish veins. The abdomen is reddish and pubescent, with short, dark hairs on the upper surface of the abdomen and longer white hairs on the sides. The second to fifth abdominal segments are bordered with grey. The male genitalia is red with a scattering of white hairs. The female ovipositor is also red.

Tapeigaster nigricornis is associated with several species of fungus, including Amanita ochrophylla and Omphalotus nidiformis.

== Taxonomy and history ==
French entomologist Pierre-Justin-Marie Macquart first described this species in 1851 as Sciomyza nigricornis, placing it in the family Sciomyzidae. Mario Bezzi then described it as Tapeigaster marginifrons in 1923. A 1982 review of the genus Tapeigaster by David McAlpine and Deborah Kent combined the species described by Macquart and Bezzi under the name Tapeigaster nigricornis.
