= Macrolepiota subcitrophylla =

Scientific classification
- Kingdom: Fungi
- Division: Basidiomycota
- Class: Agaricomycetes
- Order: Agaricales
- Family: Agaricaceae
- Genus: Macrolepiota
- Species: M. subcitrophylla

Binomial name
- Macrolepiota subcitrophylla Z.W.Ge (2012)

Species of fungus

Macrolepiota subcitrophylla is a species of agaric fungus in the family Agaricaceae. Found in Yunnan and Hunan Provinces (China), it was described as new to science in 2012 by Zai-Wei Ge. It is closely related to the Australasian Macrolepiota clelandii, but can be distinguished from that species by its yellowish gills and smaller basidiospores, which measure 9.0–12.0 by 6.5–8.0 μm. The fruitbody of M. subcitrophylla has a whitish cap covered with brownish-yellow to reddish-brown scales. Initially egg-shaped or hemispherical when young, it becomes convex to flattened with age, reaching diameters of 10.5–12 cm (4.1–4.7 in) in diameter. The roughly cylindrical stipe measures 12–14 cm (4.7–5.5 in) long by 1–1.6 cm (0.4–0.6 in) thick. The ring on the stipe is loosely attached and becomes movable with age.
