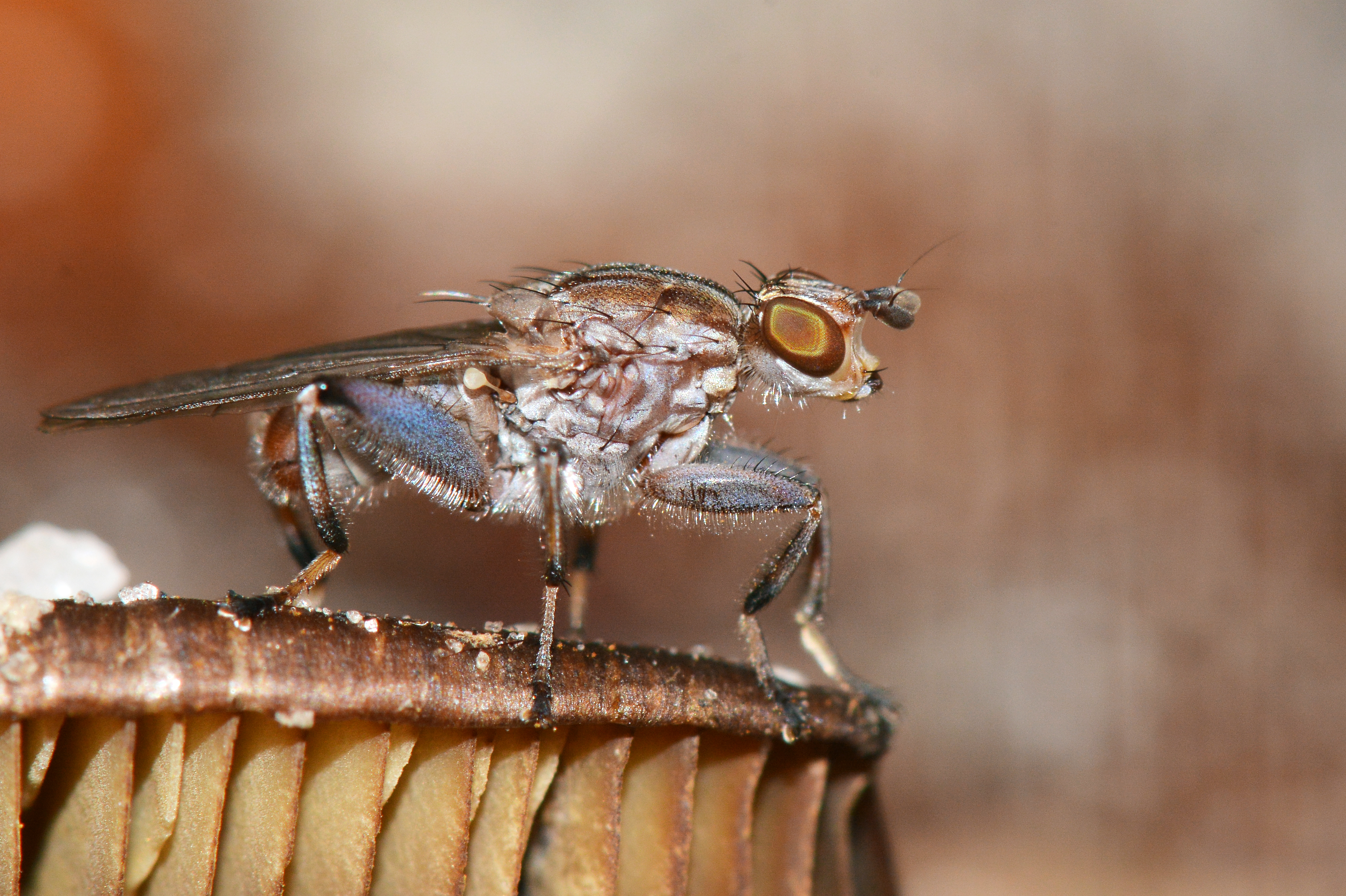
- Adult T. nigricornis photographed in Perth, Western Australia

Scientific classification
- Kingdom: Animalia
- Phylum: Arthropoda
- Clade: Pancrustacea
- Class: Insecta
- Order: Diptera
- Family: Heleomyzidae
- Subfamily: Tapeigastrinae
- Genus: Tapeigaster; Macquart, 1847

Type species
- Tapeigaster annulipes Macquart, 1847

Synonyms
- Sciomyzoptera Hendel, 1917

= Tapeigaster =

Genus of flies

Tapeigaster is a genus of medium to large sized flies in the family Heleomyzidae. Eleven species are currently described, all endemic to the temperate regions of southern and eastern Australia.

== Description ==
Adults of this genus are medium to large sized flies of medium to robust build with rounded heads, bristles on the thorax, spines on the femora, and wings that lack any dark markings. The exact morphology of the reproductive system differs between species, with specific differences more noticeable in the male reproductive systems than in the female reproductive systems.

This genus is associated with fungi, with the larvae of several species documented living inside the fruiting bodies of fungi and adults commonly found on or near mushrooms, including species from the genera Agaricus, Amanita, and Boletus.

== Taxonomy and history ==
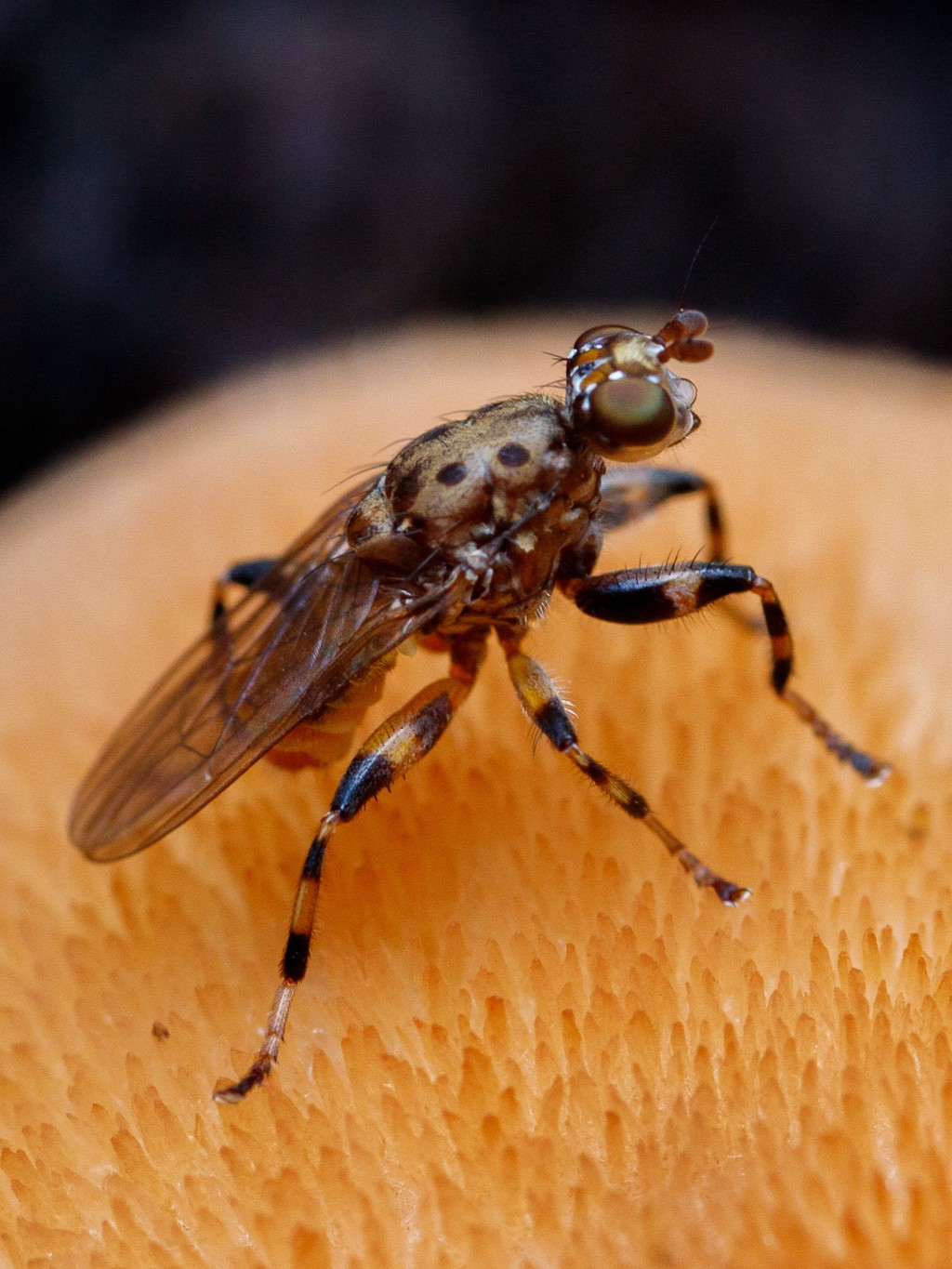
T. cinctipes photographed in Jarrahdale, Western Australia

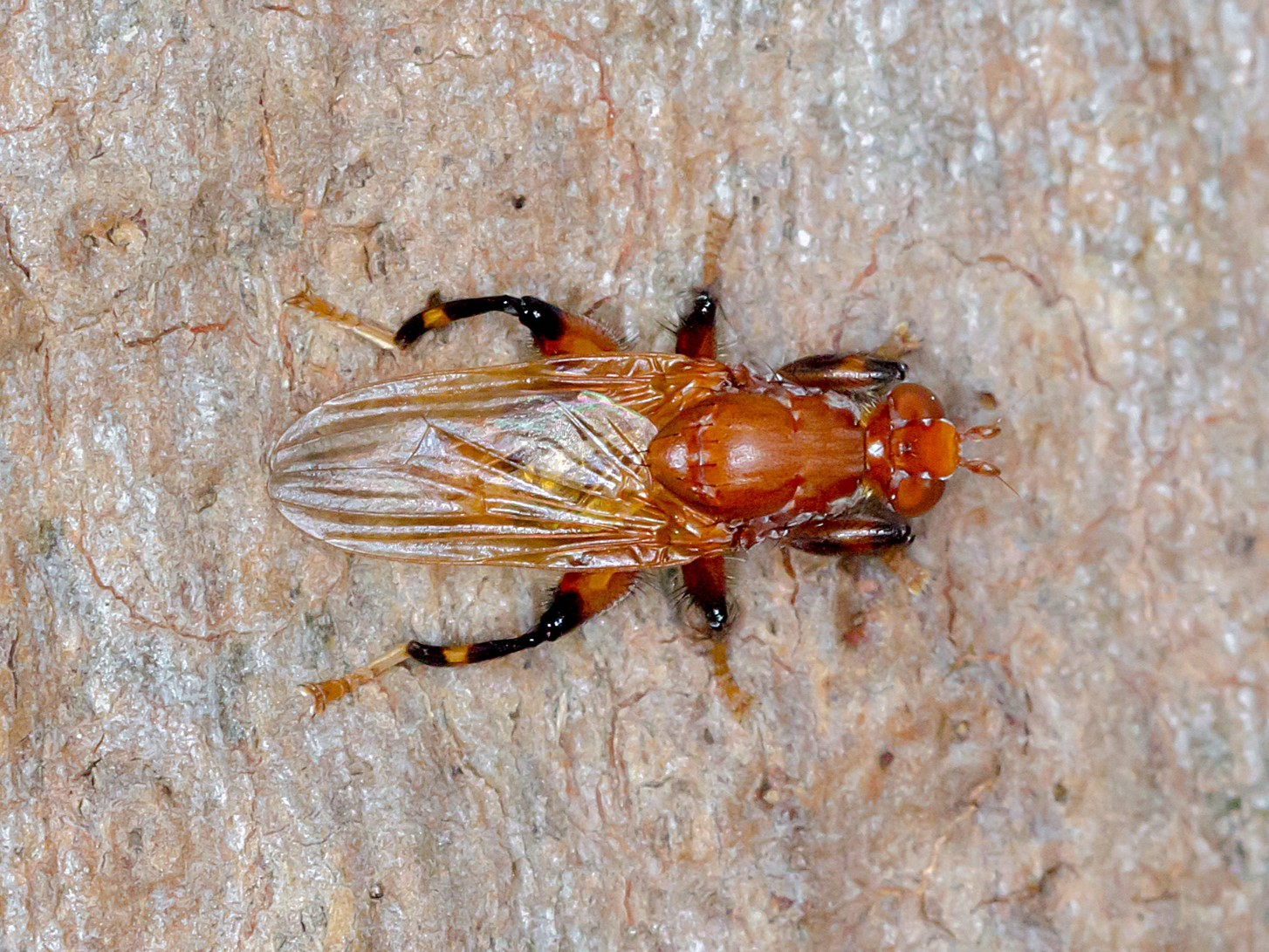
T. argyrospila photographed in Greenvale, Victoria

Tapeigaster was first described by French entomologist Pierre-Justin-Marie Macquart in 1847, placing it in the family Sciomyzidae with Tapeigaster annulipes as the type and sole species. Little was written of this genus until 1917, when Austrian entomologist Friedrich Georg Hendel described a new genus, Sciomyzoptera, which would later be synonymised with Tapeigaster by Mario Bezzi in 1923. In the same publication, Bezzi also described several new species and proposed the inclusion of Tapeigaster in the family Scatophagidae. In 1955, Sergey Paramonov placed it in the family Neottiophilidae and described two new species. David McAlpine and Deborah Kent reviewed the genus in 1982, describing four new species, synonymising five species, and placing the genus in the newly created tribe Tapeigastrini within the family Heleomyzidae. McAlpine later recharacterised Tapeigastrini as the subfamily Tapeigastrinae, which includes Tapeigaster alongside the genus Ollix.

== Species ==
This genus includes the following species:

- Tapeigaster annulata (Hendel, 1917) (New South Wales, Queensland)
- Tapeigaster annulipes Macquart, 1847 (New South Wales, Queensland, South Australia, Tasmania, Victoria)
- Tapeigaster argyrospila Bezzi, 1923 (New South Wales, Queensland, South Australia, Victoria)
- Tapeigaster brunneifrons Malloch, 1927 (Australian Capital Territory, New South Wales, Tasmania, Victoria)
- Tapeigaster cinctipes (Walker, 1853) (Australian Capital Territory, New South Wales, Tasmania, Victoria, Western Australia)
- Tapeigaster digitata McAlpine & Kent, 1982 (Australian Capital Territory, New South Wales, South Australia, Tasmania, Victoria)
- Tapeigaster luteipennis Bezzi, 1923 (New South Wales, Queensland)
- Tapeigaster nigricornis (Macquart, 1851) (New South Wales, Queensland, South Australia, Tasmania, Victoria, Western Australia)
- Tapeigaster paramonovi McAlpine & Kent, 1982 (New South Wales, South Australia, Tasmania, Victoria, Western Australia)
- Tapeigaster pulverea McAlpine & Kent, 1982 (New South Wales, Queensland, Victoria)
- Tapeigaster subglabra McAlpine & Kent, 1982 (Australian Capital Territory, New South Wales, Victoria)
