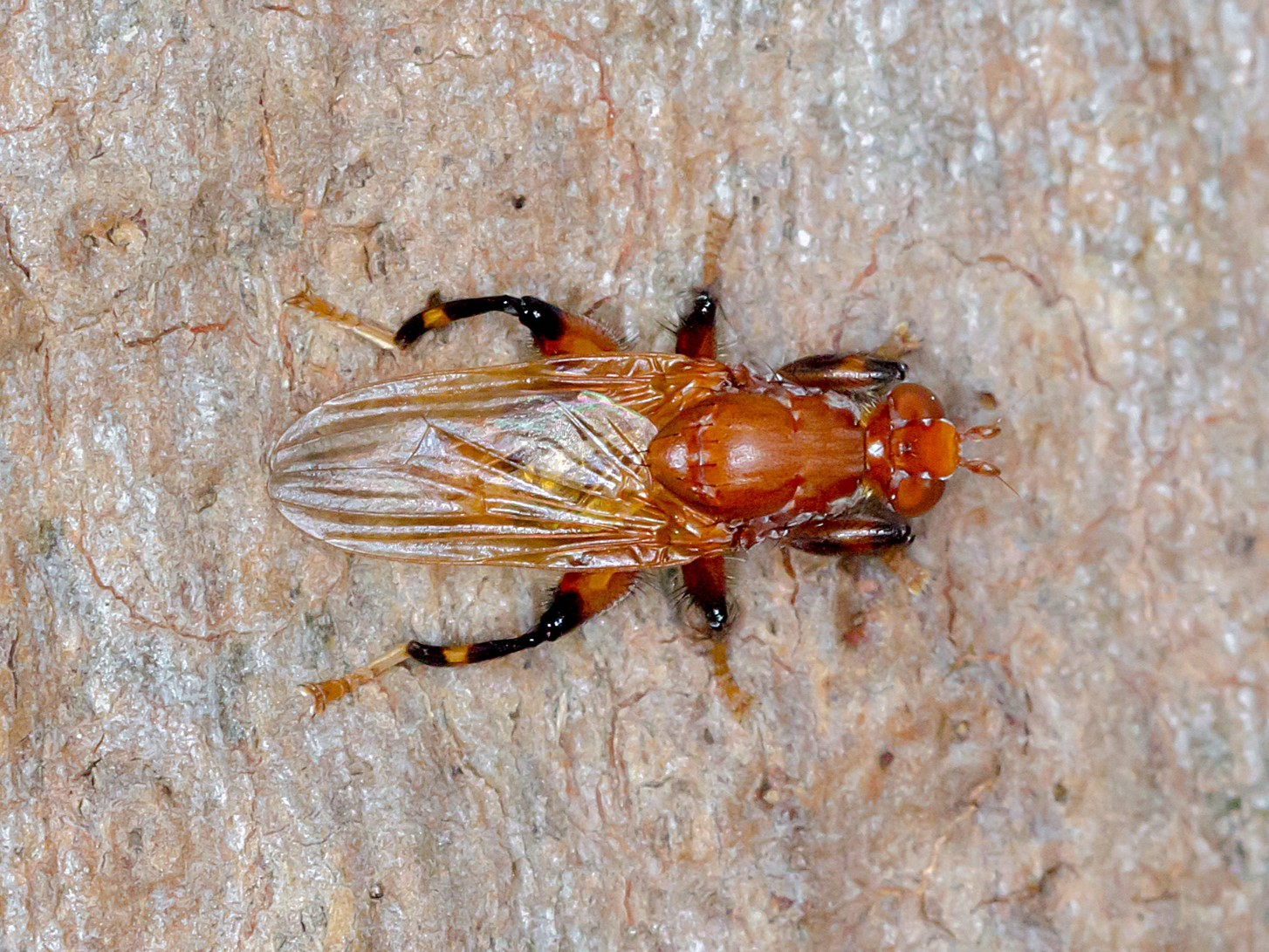
- Adult T. argyrospila photographed in Greenvale, Victoria

Scientific classification
- Kingdom: Animalia
- Phylum: Arthropoda
- Clade: Pancrustacea
- Class: Insecta
- Order: Diptera
- Family: Heleomyzidae
- Genus: Tapeigaster
- Species: T. argyrospila

Binomial name
- Tapeigaster argyrospila Bezzi, 1923

= Tapeigaster argyrospila =

Species of fly

Tapeigaster argyrospila is a species of fly in the family Heleomyzidae. It is endemic to Australia, occurring in New South Wales, Queensland, South Australia, and Victoria.

== Description ==
Adult T. argyrospila are robust flies with bodies measuring 10 mm (0.39 in) long and wings measuring 9 mm (0.35 in) long. The antennae are reddish, measuring significantly shorter than the face, with the third joint being circular in shape and dusted with white pruinescence. The frons is purplish and noticeably concave. The occiput is reddish, with five silvery-white spots bordering each eye. The proboscis is reddish, and all bristles on the head are black. The thorax is reddish, with thick yellowish dust forming a broad but indistinct longitudinal stripe on top. The sides of the thorax lack this yellow dusting, instead having a number of indistinct silvery-white spots. The scutellum is a shining reddish-yellow. The calypters and halteres are yellow. The legs are short and thick, with the fore and hind femora especially thickened. The femora are shining red in colour, with the fore femora having a large black blotch around the middle. The femora are hairy, with long whitish or yellowish hairs underneath and black hairs above. The tibiae are black with a broad yellow ring near the middle, and the tarsi are whitish. The wings are yellow with reddish veins. The abdomen is mostly black, with a reddish base and yellow terminal segment. The genitalia are large and yellow, with a covering of yellow hairs.
