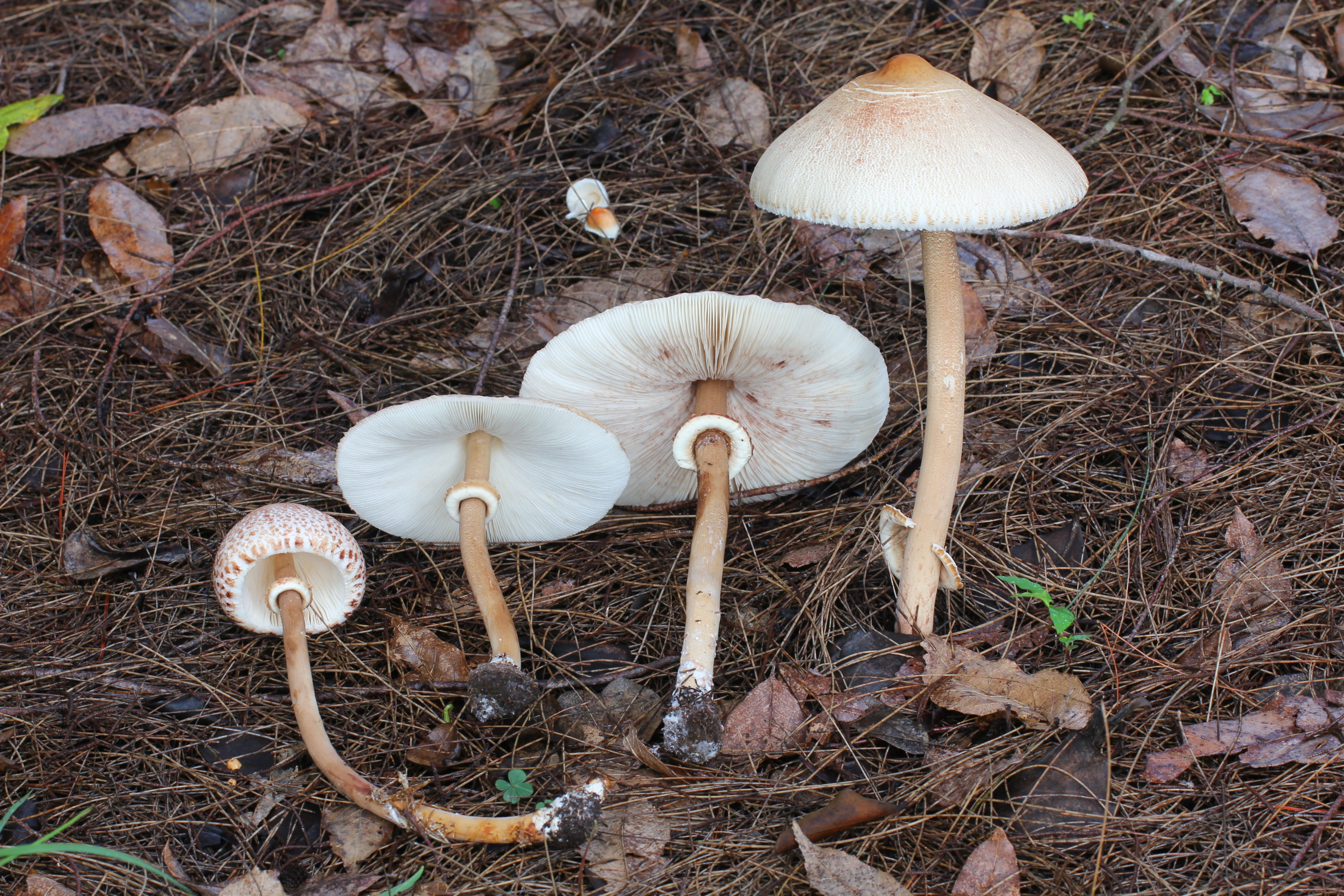
- Macrolepiota sp.

Scientific classification
- Kingdom: Fungi
- Division: Basidiomycota
- Class: Agaricomycetes
- Order: Agaricales
- Family: Agaricaceae
- Genus: Macrolepiota; Singer (1948)

Type species
- Macrolepiota procera (Scop.) Singer (1948)

Synonyms
- Lepiotella Rick (1938); Rickella Locq. (1952); Volvolepiota Singer (1959)

= Macrolepiota =

Genus of fungi

Macrolepiota is a genus of white spored, gilled mushrooms of the family Agaricaceae. The best-known member is the parasol mushroom (M. procera). The widespread genus contains about 40 species.

== Taxonomy ==
Macrolepiota was circumscribed by Rolf Singer in 1948, with Macrolepiota procera as the type species.

DNA studies have split this genus into three clades. The macrolepiota clade includes M. procera, M. clelandii, M. dolichaula and closely related species. The macrosporae clade includes species such as M. mastoidea, M. konradii, and M. orientiexcoriata, while the volvatae clade includes M. velosa and M. eucharis.

== Uses ==
Macrolepiota procera, the parasol mushroom, is a well-known and highly esteemed edible species in much of Europe.

== Species ==
As of October 2015, Index Fungorum accepts 42 species of Macrolepiota:

- Macrolepiota africana (R.Heim) Heinem. 1969 – Cameroon
- Macrolepiota albida Heinem. 1969
- Macrolepiota albuminosa (Berk.) Pegler 1972
- Macrolepiota ampliospora Sosin 1960
- Macrolepiota bonaerensis (Speg.) Singer 1951 – São Paulo
- Macrolepiota brasiliensis (Rick) Raithelh. 1988
- Macrolepiota brunnescens Vellinga 2003
- Macrolepiota campestris Lebedeva ex Samgina 1983
- Macrolepiota citrinascens Vasas 1990
- Macrolepiota clelandii Grgur. 1997 – Australasia
- Macrolepiota colombiana Franco-Mol. 1999
- Macrolepiota crustosa L.P. Shao & C.T. Xiang 1980 – China
- Macrolepiota detersa Z.W.Ge, Zhu L.Yang & Vellinga 2010 – China
- Macrolepiota dolichaula (Berk. & Broome) Pegler & R.W.Rayner 1969
- Macrolepiota eucharis Vellinga & Halling 2003 – Australia
- Macrolepiota excoriata (Schaeff.) Wasser 1978
- Macrolepiota fornica Raithelh. 1988
- Macrolepiota fuligineosquarrosa Malençon 1979 – Morocco
- Macrolepiota fuliginosa (Barla) Bon 1977 – Great Britain
- Macrolepiota gasteroidea T.Lebel 2011 – Australia
- Macrolepiota gracilenta (Krombh.) Wasser 1978
- Macrolepiota imbricata (Henn.) Pegler 1966
- Macrolepiota kerandi (Speg.) Singer 1951
- Macrolepiota konradii (Huijsman ex P.D.Orton) M.M.Moser 1967
- Macrolepiota mallea (Berk.) Manjula 1983
- Macrolepiota mastoidea (Fr.) Singer 1951 – Europe, Australia
- Macrolepiota odorata Heinem. 1969
- Macrolepiota orientiexcoriata Z.W.Ge, Zhu L.Yang & Vellinga 2010 – China
- Macrolepiota permixta (Barla) Pacioni 1979 – Great Britain
- Macrolepiota phaeodisca Bellù 1984 – Spain
- Macrolepiota procera (Scop.) Singer 1948 – Europe, Russia
- Macrolepiota prominens (Sacc.) M.M.Moser 1967
- Macrolepiota psammophila Guinb. 1996
- Macrolepiota pulchella de Meijer & Vellinga 2003
- Macrolepiota rubescens (L.M.Dufour) Pázmány 1985
- Macrolepiota stercoraria (Rick) Raithelh. 1988
- Macrolepiota subcitrophylla Z.W.Ge 2012 – China
- Macrolepiota turbinata T.Lebel 2011 – Australia
- Macrolepiota velosa Vellinga & Zhu L.Yang 2003 – China
- Macrolepiota vinaceofibrillosa T.Lebel 2011 – Australia
- Macrolepiota zeyheri (Berk. & Singer) Heinem. 1962

== See also ==
- List of Agaricaceae genera
- List of Agaricales genera
- Lepiota
- Chlorophyllum
