= Tapeigaster annulipes =

Scientific classification
- Kingdom: Animalia
- Phylum: Arthropoda
- Clade: Pancrustacea
- Class: Insecta
- Order: Diptera
- Family: Heleomyzidae
- Genus: Tapeigaster
- Species: T. annulipes

Binomial name
- Tapeigaster annulipes Macquart, 1847

Synonyms
- Dryomyza cingulipes Walker, 1858

Species of fly

Tapeigaster annulipes is a species of fly in the family Heleomyzidae. It is endemic to Australia, occurring in New South Wales, Queensland, South Australia, Tasmania, and Victoria. It is common and widely distributed within this range and can be found in forested and urban areas alike.

== Description ==
Adult T. annulipes are medium-sized flies with bodies and wings measuring 7–8 mm (0.28–0.31 in) long. All bristles on the head and thorax are black, as are the antennae and arista. The thorax is reddish, with a broad grey longitudinal stripe running down the middle of the mesoscutum from the neck to the scutellum and broad grey stripes running down the sides of the thorax. The halteres are whitish and the scutellum is the same reddish colour as the rest of the thorax, only dusted with grey at the base. The legs are a shining reddish yellow with dark spots on the femora. The fore and middle femora are thickened, most strongly in males, and all femora exhibit black bristles on the upper surface and a covering of white hairs below. The tarsi become black towards the claws. The abdomen is reddish and pubescent, with the middle segments having a darkened hind border. The male genitalia is prominent, reddish yellow with long, dark hairs. The female ovipositor is red.

Tapeigaster annulipes is associated with several species of fungus, including Agaricus campestris and Omphalotus nidiformis.

== Taxonomy and history ==
French entomologist Pierre-Justin-Marie Macquart first described this species in 1847 as the type and sole species of the genus Tapeigaster. Francis Walker then described it as Dryomyza cingulipes in 1858 based on a specimen from New South Wales. Mario Bezzi synonymised the two under Macquart's original name of Tapeigaster annulipes in 1923.
