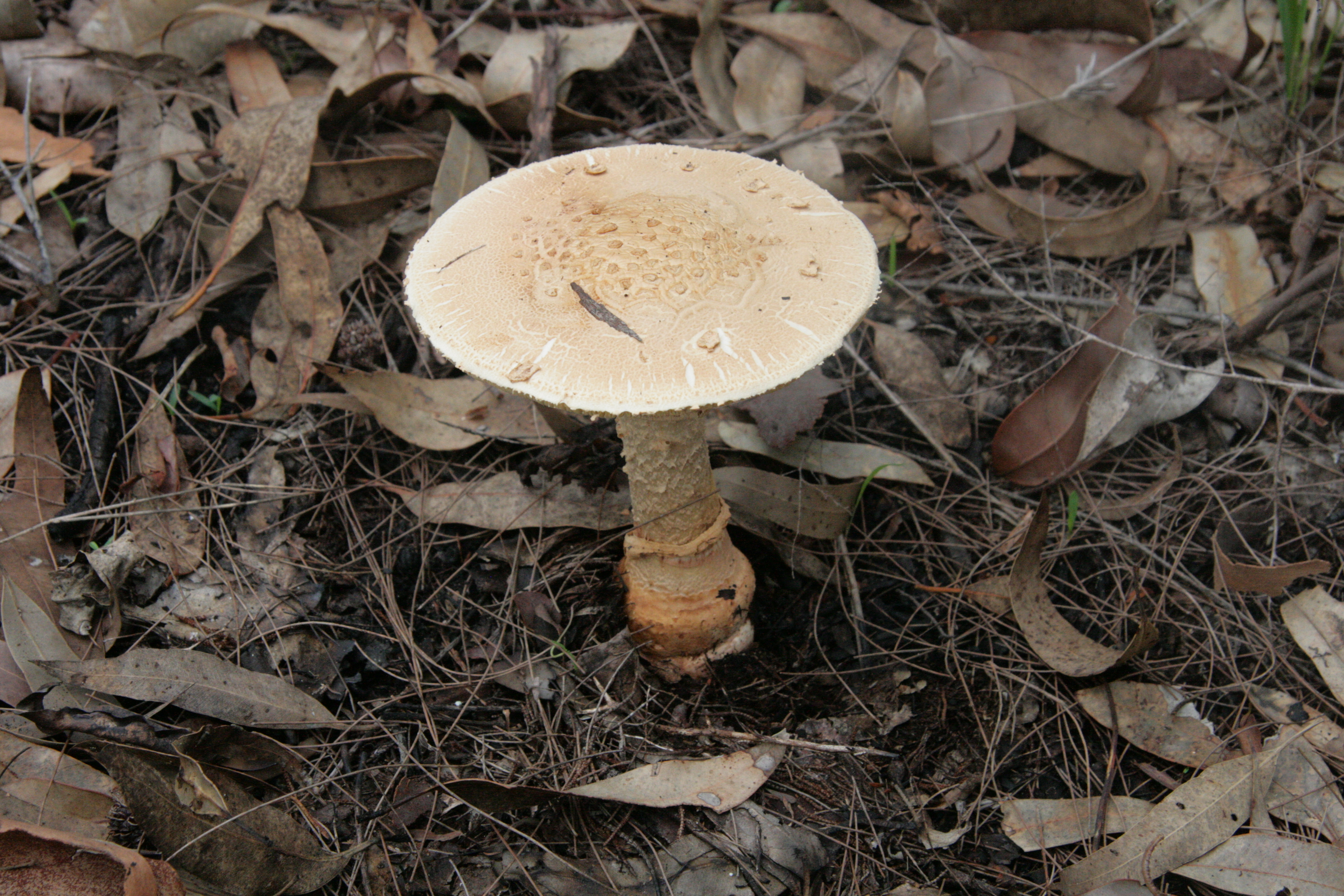
- Amanita ochrophylla, Georges River National Park

Scientific classification
- Domain: Eukaryota
- Kingdom: Fungi
- Division: Basidiomycota
- Class: Agaricomycetes
- Order: Agaricales
- Family: Amanitaceae
- Genus: Amanita
- Species: A. ochrophylla

Binomial name
- Amanita ochrophylla (Cooke & Massee) Cleland

Synonyms
- Agaricus ochrophyllus Cooke & Massee; Lepiota ochrophylla (Cooke & Massee) Sacc. Aspidella ochrophylla (Cooke & Massee) E.-J. Gilbert

= Amanita ochrophylla =

Ochre-gilled barefoot lepidella

Species of fungus

Amanita ochrophylla is a fungus of the family Amanitaceae native to southeastern Australia. Its large and distinctive buff fruit bodies are common after rainfall.

== Taxonomy ==
English mycologists Mordecai Cubitt Cooke and George Edward Massee described this species as Agaricus ochrophyllus in 1889, from a specimen collected from "sandy land near Brisbane". They thought it allied to Macrolepiota procera and placed it in the subgenus Lepiota. They described its gills as having the colour of "washed leather". Pier Andrea Saccardo named it Lepiota ochrophylla in 1891. It was placed in the genus Amanita by Australian mycologist John Burton Cleland in 1924. Within the genus Amanita, it is in the subgenus Lepidella, section Lepidella and subsection Gymnopodae. Molecular analysis showed a close relationship with A. proxima.

== Description ==
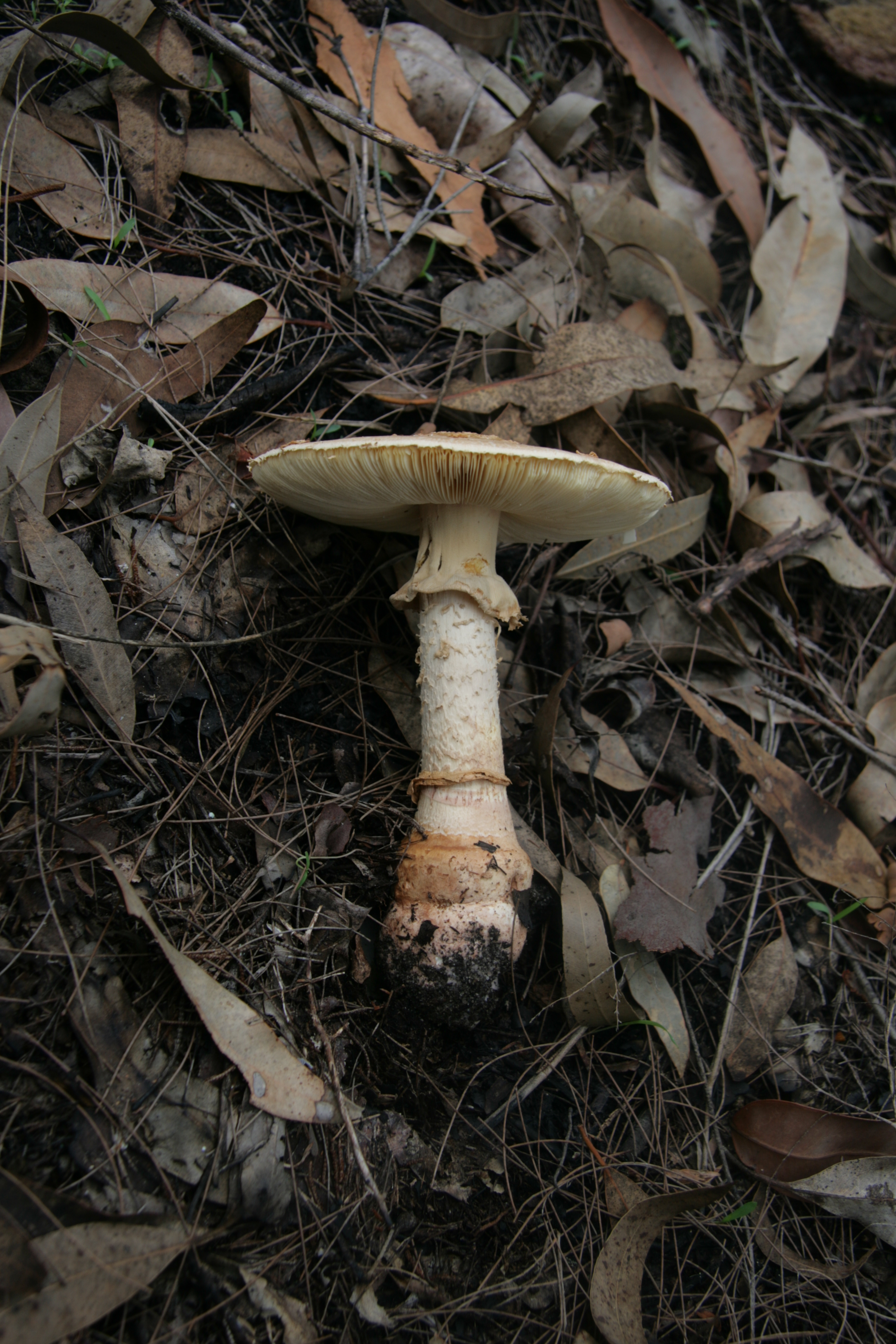
Side view showing double ring and base

The fruit body is a large stocky buff- or ochre-coloured mushroom sometimes with shades of orange or pink on the stalk or cap. The cap is convex and rounded when young and opening out and flattening to flat-convex or flat. Reaching up to 30 centimetres (12 inches) in diameter, the cap is often covered with small thin flat scales that are slightly paler than the cap colour. The thin crowded gills are free, and cream or buff, becoming darker as the mushroom ages. The spore print is white. The thick stalk has a double ring which helps identify it. The main upper ring is attached high up on the stalk just underneath the gills. It is membranous and can break off. The second ring is smaller and thicker. The solid stalk is up to 15 cm (6 in) high and 2 cm (3/4 in) wide. The large bulbous base is shaped like an inverted cone, and up to 4 cm in diameter.

Under a microscope, the spores are oval-shaped and measure 9.3–10.8 by 5.4–7.4 μm.

The mushrooms have a stale odour, reminiscent of ants.

== Distribution and habitat ==
Found across the southeastern part of the continent, A. ochrophylla has been recorded from southeastern South Australia, Victoria, throughout New South Wales and Queensland.

Forestry records from Tasmania have it recorded predominantly from wet forests. It has been recorded from Mount Wellington.

The fruit bodies appear after heavy rainfall.

It often appears on roadsides.

A field study showed that A. ochrophylla fruit bodies of identical genetic profile were found up covering areas of up 60 m (200 ft) diameter, suggesting a single genet was responsible, and that hence these units could be up to 60 m (200 ft) diameter in undisturbed eucalypt forest.

== Toxicity ==
Its smell would usually preclude people trying to consume it, and its edibility is unknown. At Wedderburn south of Sydney, a Lao family picked and consumed this species, perhaps along with A. volvarielloides. One member suffered poisoning with hepatotoxic effects similar to those of deadly amanitas, with A. volvarielloides perhaps being the culprit.

== See also ==
- List of Amanita species
