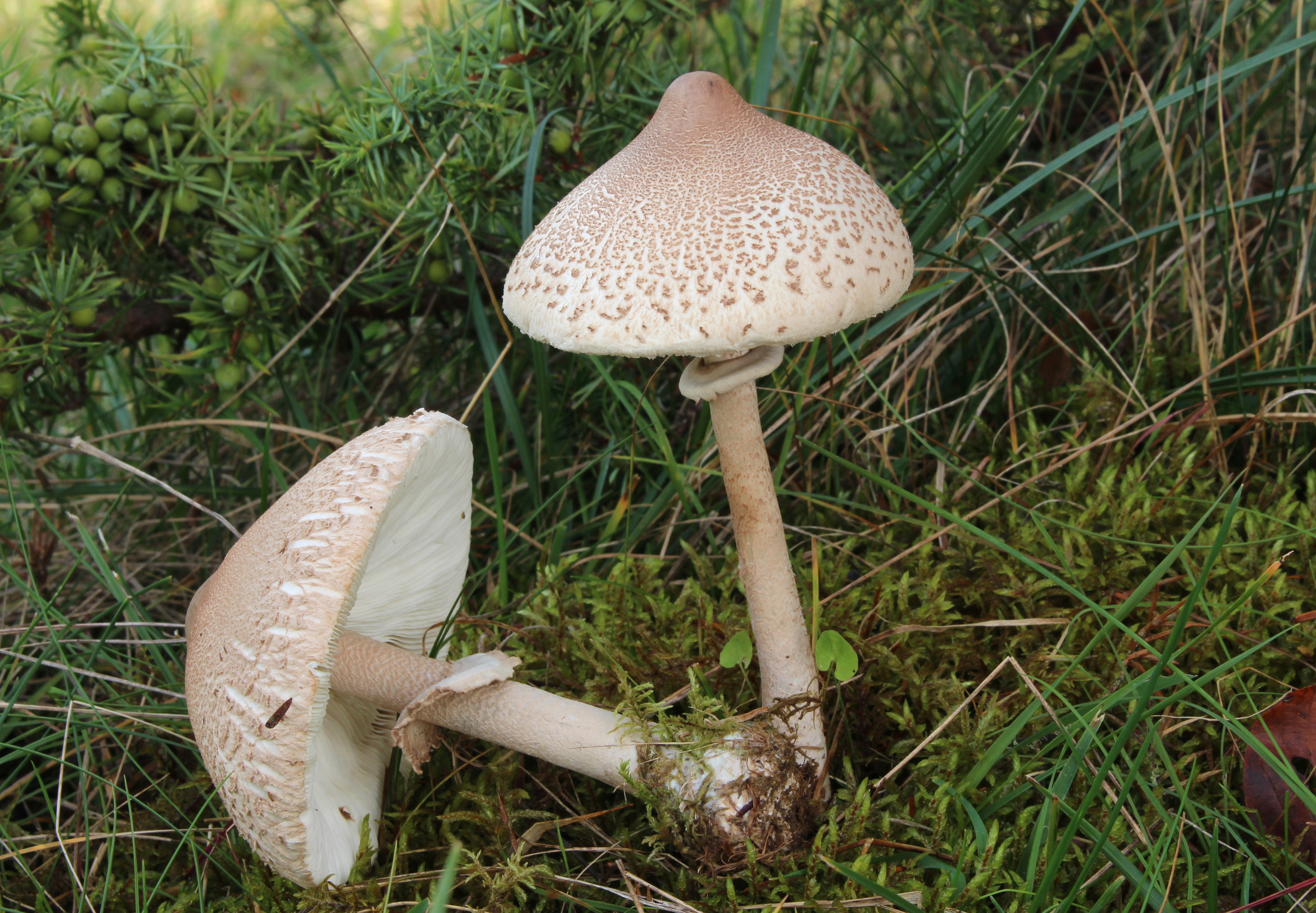

Scientific classification
- Domain: Eukaryota
- Kingdom: Fungi
- Division: Basidiomycota
- Class: Agaricomycetes
- Order: Agaricales
- Family: Agaricaceae
- Genus: Macrolepiota
- Species: M. mastoidea

Binomial name
- Macrolepiota mastoidea (Fr.) Singer, 1951

Synonyms
- Agaricus mastoideus Fr., 1821; Lepiota mastoidea (Fr.) P. Kumm., 1871; Lepiota excoriata subsp. mastoidea (Fr.) Quél.1888; Leucocoprinus mastoideus (Fr.) Singer 1939; Lepiotophyllum mastoideum (Fr.) Locq., 1942; Agaricus gracilentus Krombh., 1836; Lepiota rickenii Velen., 1939; Lepiota excoriata var. konradii Huijsman, 1943; Lepiota konradii Huijsman ex P.D. Orton, 1960

= Macrolepiota mastoidea =

Species of fungus

Macrolepiota mastoidea Mycological characteristics
- Gills on hymenium
- Cap is umbonate or flat
- Hymenium is free
- Stipe has a ring
- Spore print is white to cream
- Ecology is saprotrophic
- Edibility is edible

Macrolepiota mastoidea is a species of mushroom producing fungus in the family Agaricaceae.

== Taxonomy ==
It was first described by many mycologists throughout the 1800s and classified variously as Agaricus gracilentus, Agaricus mastoideus, Agaricus umbonatus with each synonym then undergoing its own extensive period of reclassification. It got its current name Macrolepiota mastoidea in 1951 when classified by the German mycologist Rolf Singer.

== Description ==
It grows up to 15 centimetres (6 in) wide and tall. The cap is white with brown scales in the center. The stem has a ring and is enlarged at the base.

=== Similar species ===
It can appear similar to some toxic Chlorophyllum species.

== Habitat and distribution ==
This species is found in Europe from August to November.

== Edibility ==
The species is reported to be edible, sans the tough stem, but it can appear similar to some toxic species.
