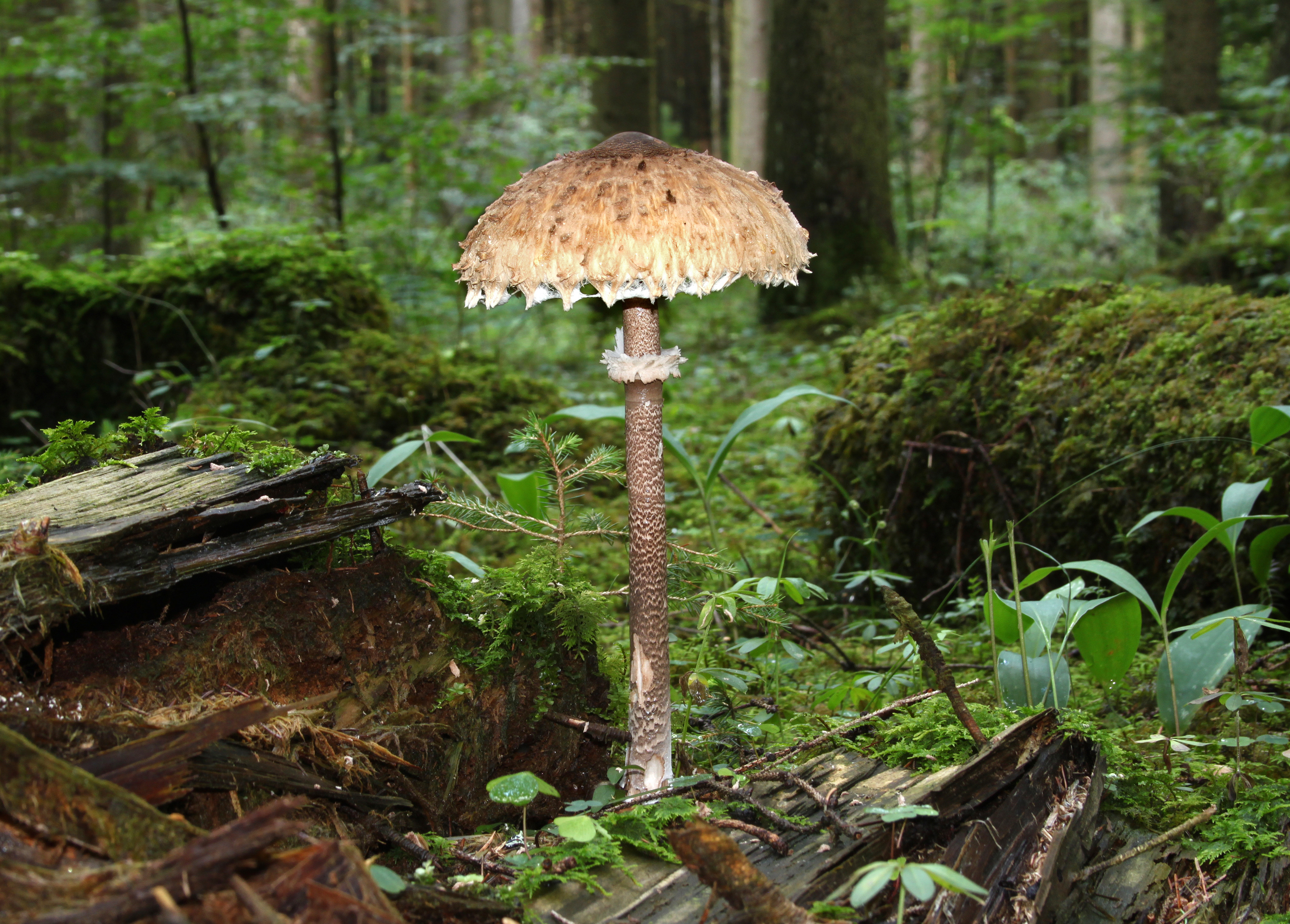

Scientific classification
- Kingdom: Fungi
- Division: Basidiomycota
- Class: Agaricomycetes
- Order: Agaricales
- Family: Agaricaceae
- Genus: Macrolepiota
- Species: M. procera

Binomial name
- Macrolepiota procera (Scop.) Singer (1948)

Synonyms
- Agaricus procerus Scop. (1772); Lepiota procera (Scop.) Gray (1821); Amanita procera (Scop.) Fr. (1836); Mastocephalus procerus (Scop.) Pat. (1900); Leucocoprinus procerus (Scop.) Pat. (1900); Lepiotophyllum procerum (Scop.) Locq. (1942)

= Macrolepiota procera =

Species of fungus

Macrolepiota procera
- Mycological characteristics
- Gills on hymenium
- Cap is umbonate
- Hymenium is free
- Stipe has a ring
- Spore print is white
- Ecology is saprotrophic
- Edibility is choice

Macrolepiota procera, the parasol mushroom, is a basidiomycete fungus with a large, prominent fruiting body resembling a parasol. It resembles some toxic species such as Chlorophyllum molybdites.

It is a fairly common species on well-drained soils. It is found solitary or in groups and fairy rings in pastures and occasionally in woodland. It is widespread in temperate regions of Eurasia and possibly North America. It is a well-regarded edible mushroom.

== Taxonomy ==
The fungus was first described in 1772 by Italian naturalist Giovanni Antonio Scopoli, who named it Agaricus procerus. Rolf Singer transferred it to the genus Macrolepiota in 1948.

== Description ==
The immature cap is compact and egg-shaped, with the cap margin around the stipe, sealing a chamber inside the cap. As it matures, the margin breaks off, leaving a fleshy, movable ring around the stipe. The cap can reach 25 centimetres (10 in) wide. At full maturity, the cap is more or less flat, with a smooth, dark umbo in the centre. Dark and cap-coloured flakes remain on the upper surface of the cap and can be removed easily.

The stipe is relatively thin, growing up to 12–40 cm (4 1/2–15 1/2 in) long and 1.5 cm thick, reaching its full height before the cap expands. Below the ring, the stem has scaly growths, creating the appearance of snakeskin. The gills are crowded, free, and white or pale pink in age. The spore print is white. The whitish flesh may have a pale pink hue but does not stain when cut. It has a pleasant nutty smell.

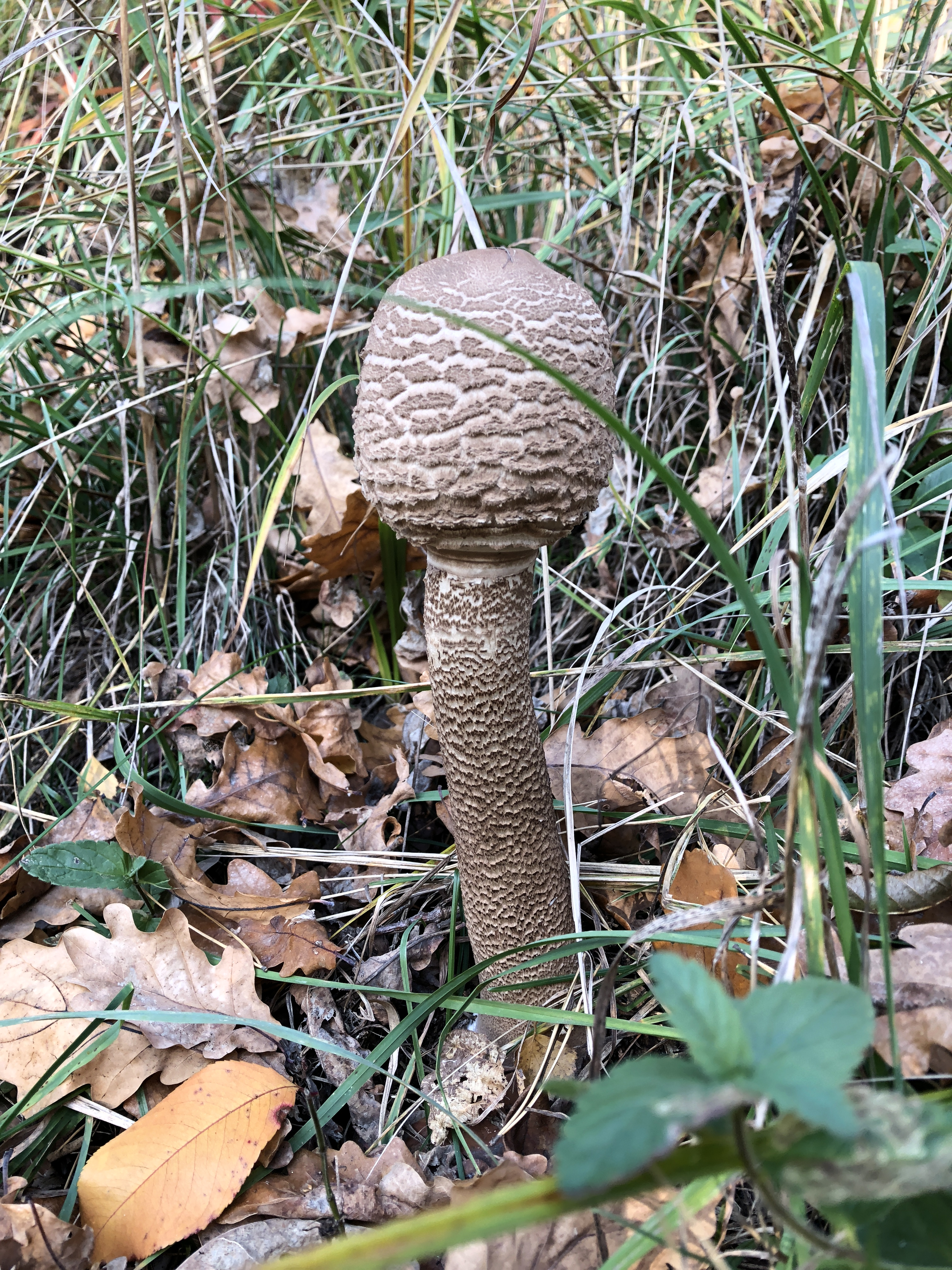
Immature variant

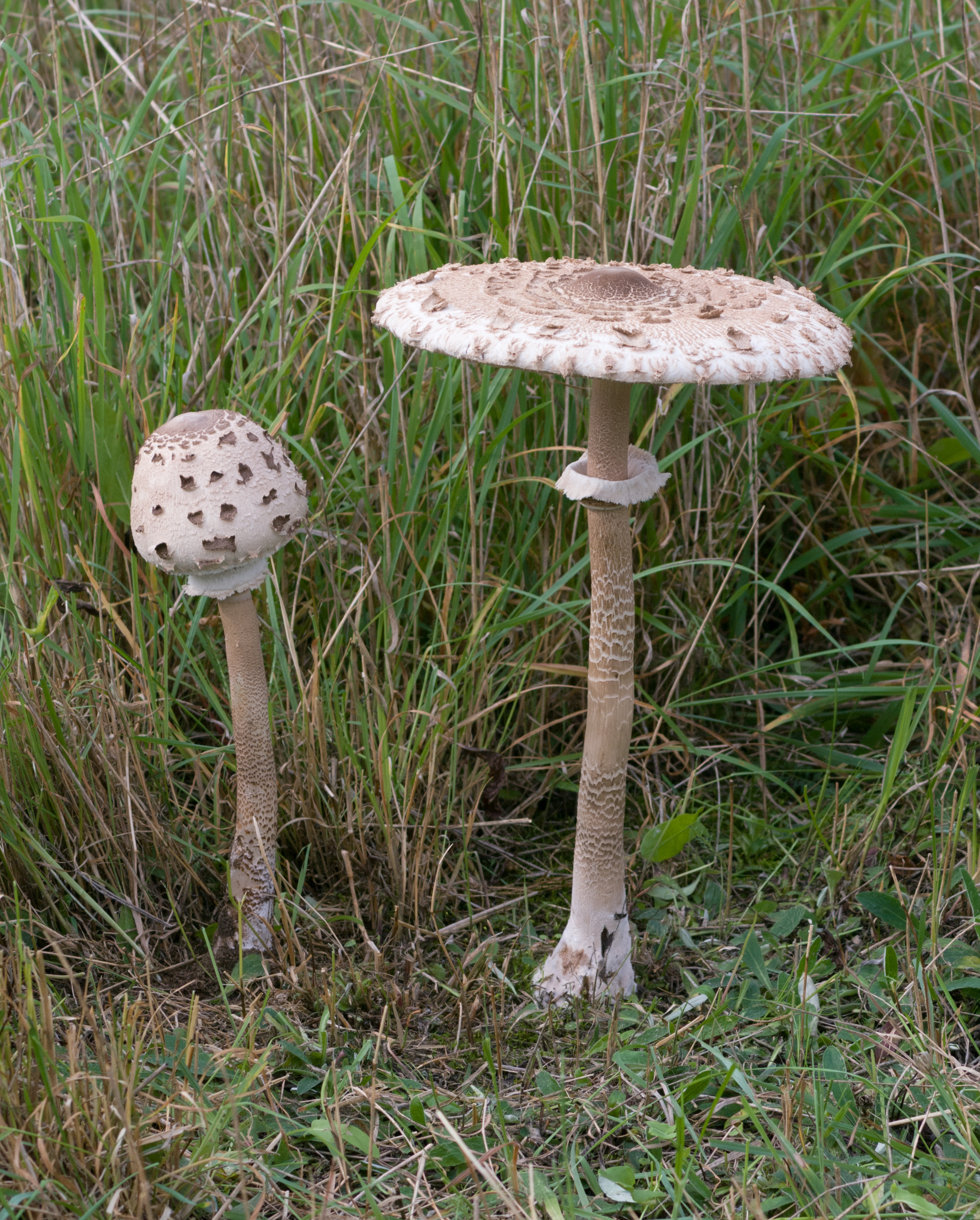
Young and mature forms

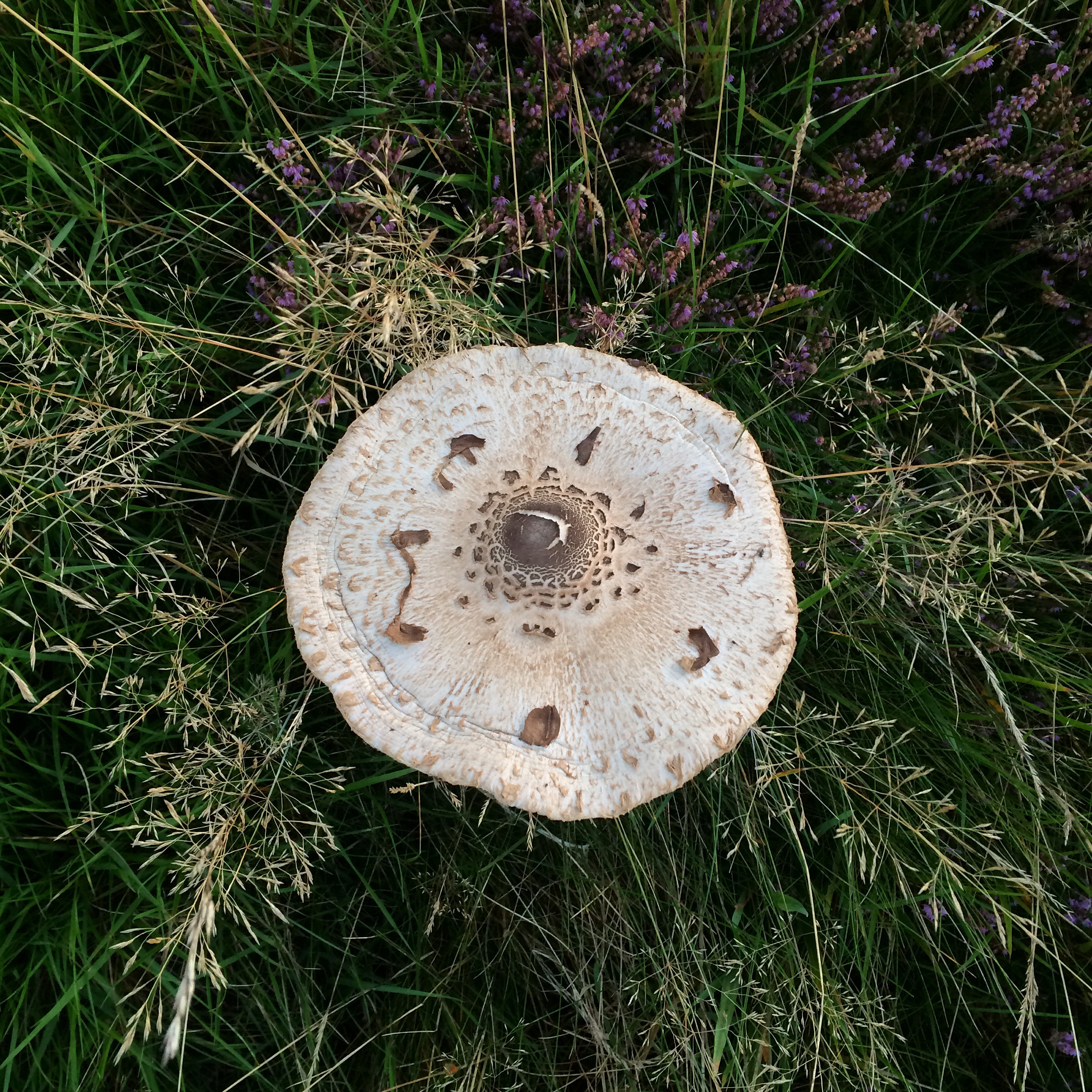
Cap detail

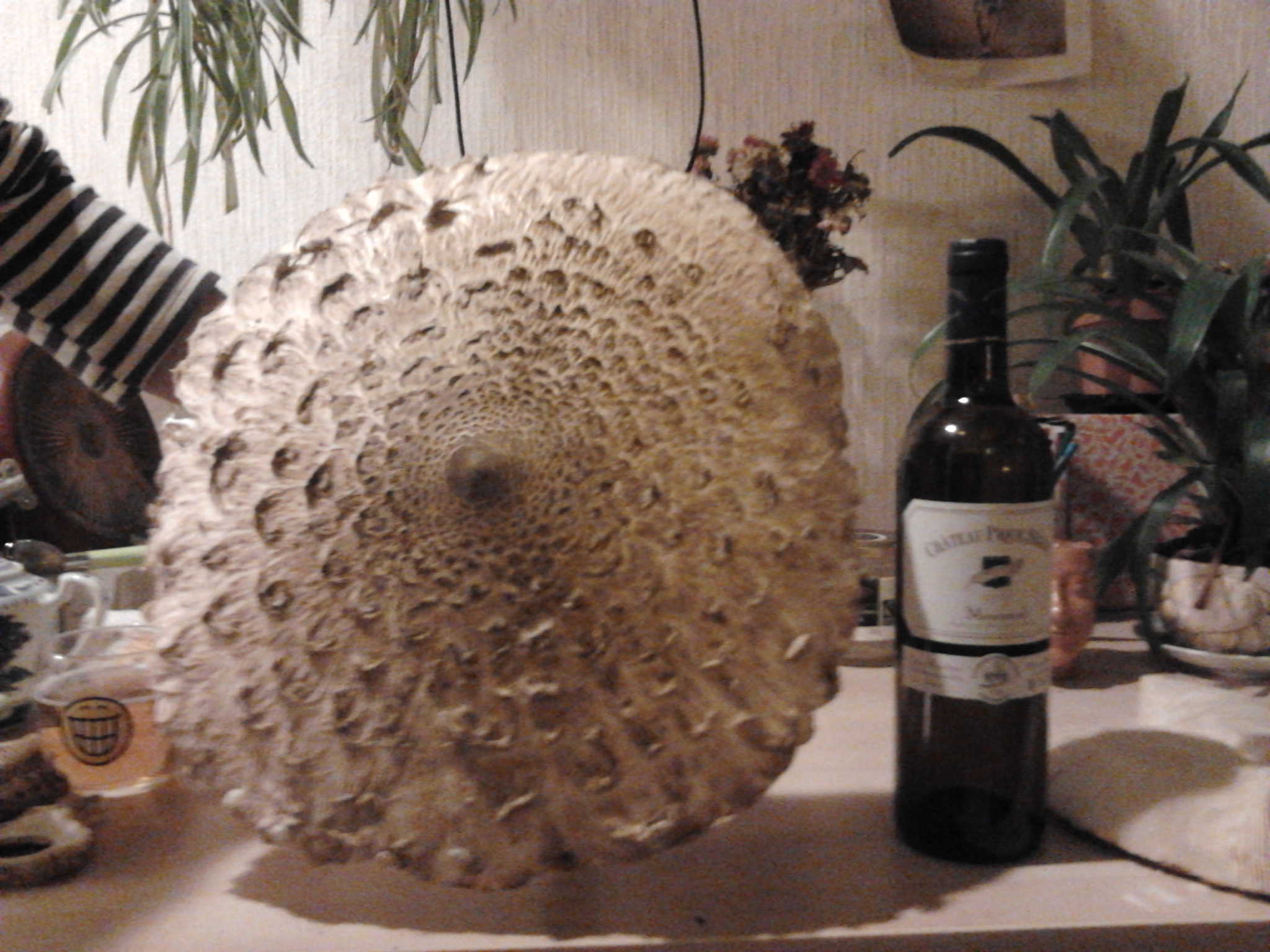
Specimen with wine bottle for size comparison

=== Similar species ===
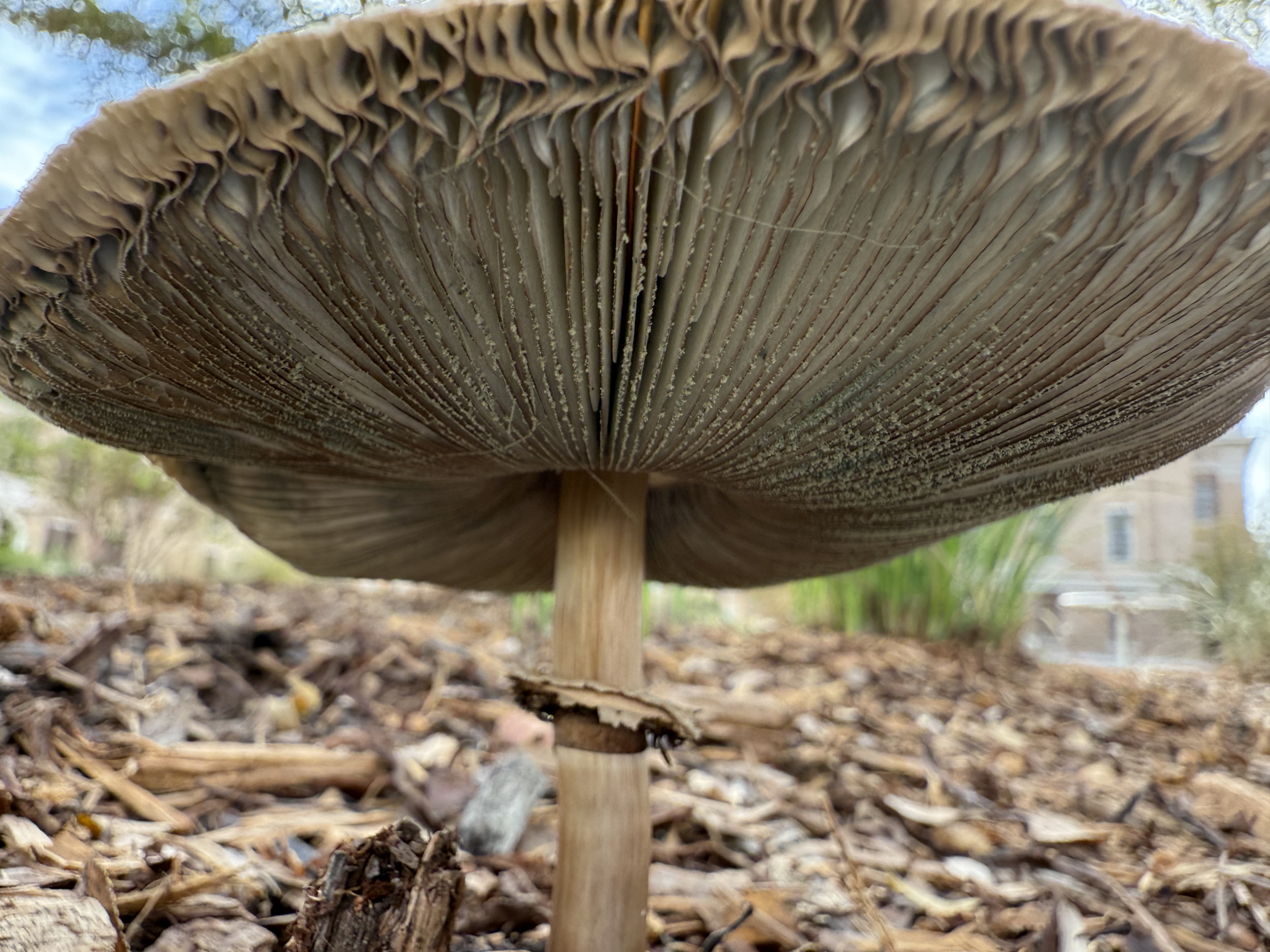
The toxic Chlorophyllum molybdites can be identified by its greenish gills and spores, as well as the lack of a snakeskin pattern.

Although the parasol mushroom is difficult to mistake for any other, there are a few similar-looking poisonous species.

- Chlorophyllum molybdites causes the largest number of annual mushroom poisonings in North America due to its close similarity. Faintly green gills and a pale green spore deposit give it away, along with the stipe lacking a snakeskin pattern. Its range is reportedly expanding into Europe.
- Leucocoprinus brunnea, also found in North America, slowly turns brown when sliced.
- White and immature species of Amanita are also a potential hazard. To be sure, one must only pick parasol mushrooms past their button stage. Generally, the parasol mushroom has darker flakes on a lighter surface, whereas Amanitas have the opposite, lighter flakes (if any) on a darker surface, such as A. pantherina (panther cap); this rule does not apply to all species, such as A. smithiana.
- Cystoderma amianthinum (saffron parasol) is much smaller and not often eaten.
- Lepiota brunneoincarnata is much smaller than M. procera and known to have caused fatal poisonings in Spain.

Additionally, members of Chlorophyllum section Rhacodium lack the snakeskin pattern, such as the smaller C. rhacodes (shaggy parasol), which has an overlapping range. Macrolepiota mastoidea is a rare European edible mushroom, generally smaller than M. procera and well less obvious stipe markings. Agaricus species have brown spores and the gills of mature specimens are never white.

== Habitat and distribution ==
Macrolepiota procera is a fairly common species on well-drained soils. It is found solitary or in groups and fairy rings in pastures and occasionally in woodland. It is widespread in temperate regions of Eurasia and possibly North America. Further research is needed to confirm whether specimens found in North America are the same species.

== Uses ==
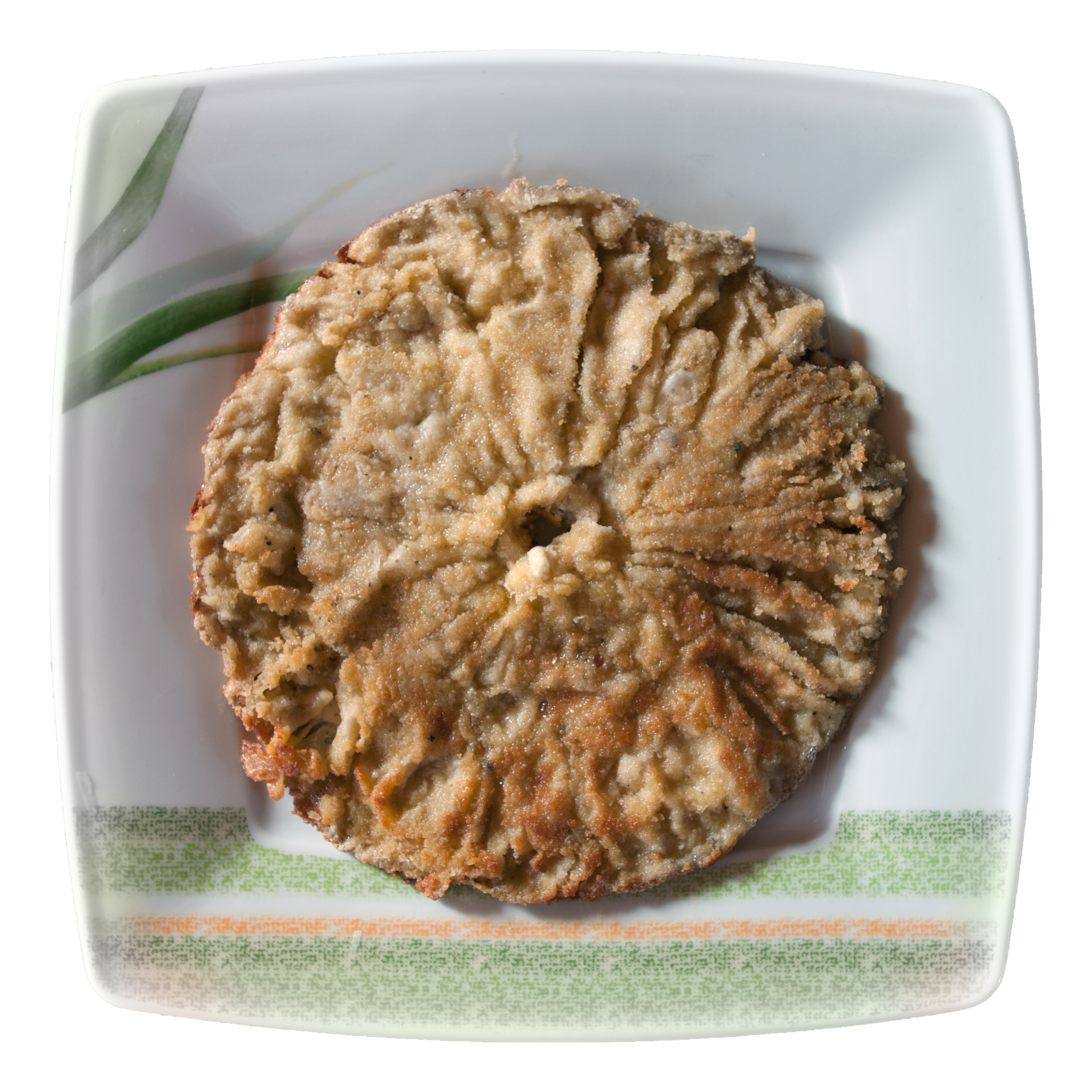
A breaded mushroom

The species is choice as an edible mushroom. It is sought after and popular in Europe, due in part to its large size, seasonal frequency, and versatility in the kitchen. In the United Kingdom, it can be found from July through to November. The stipe is inedible due to being very fibrous in texture, unless dried and ground into a powder.

These mushrooms are popularly sauteed in melted butter. In central and eastern European countries this mushroom is usually prepared similarly to a cutlet. It is usually run through egg and breadcrumbs and then fried in a pan with some oil or butter. A savory Slovak recipe is to bake caps stuffed with ground pork, oregano, and garlic. Italians and Austrians also serve the young, still-spherical caps stuffed with seasoned minced beef, baked in the same manner as stuffed peppers.

== Other common names ==
In some parts of Europe, it is known as the "snake's hat" or "snake's sponge" due to its scales.
