= Pileus (mycology) =

Mushroom cap

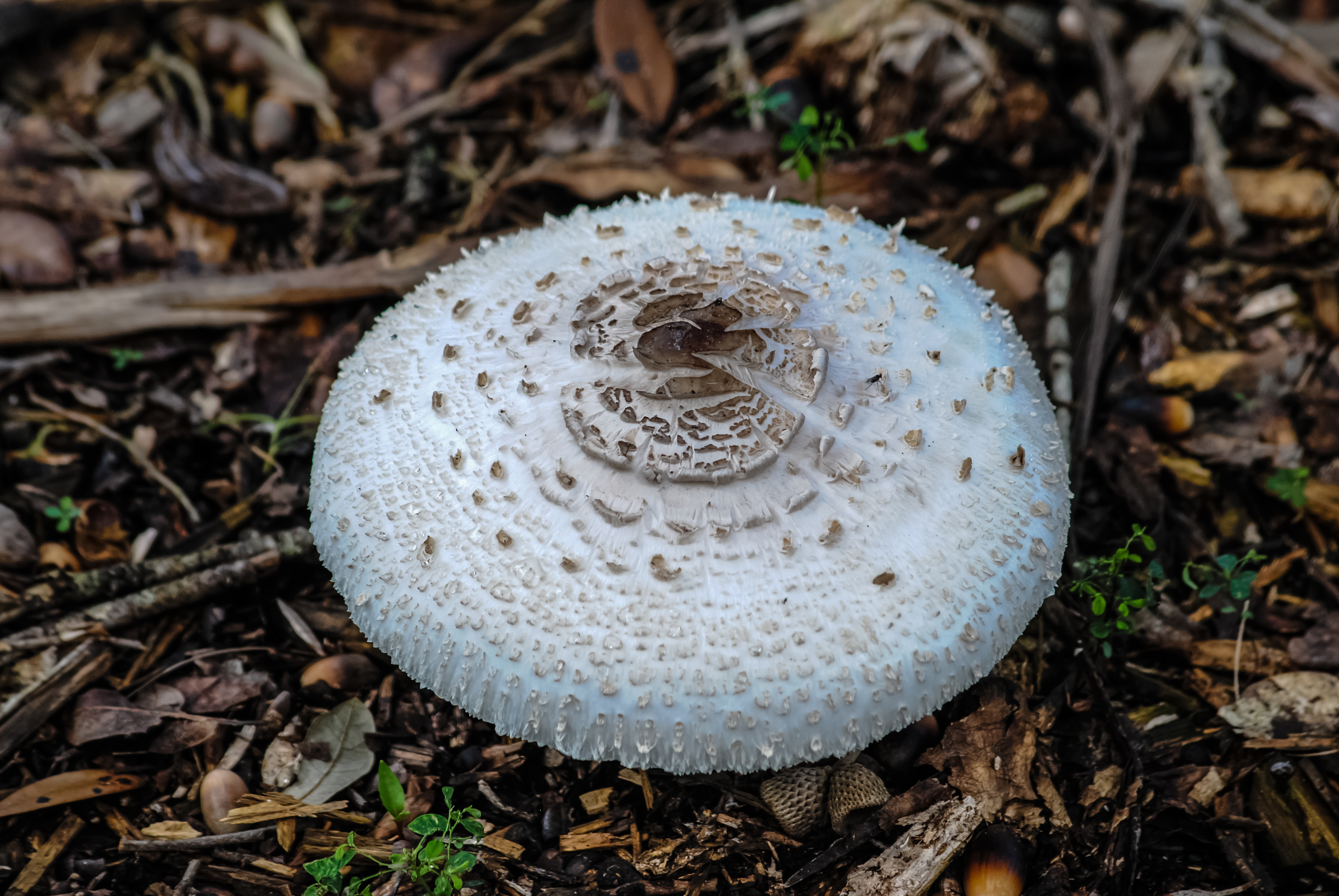
Photo of a pileus or mushroom cap

In mycology, the pileus (pl.: pilei) is the cap or cap-like part of a basidiocarp or ascocarp (fungal fruiting body) that supports a spore-bearing surface, the hymenium. The hymenium (hymenophore) may consist of lamellae, tubes, or teeth, on the underside of the pileus. A pileus is characteristic of agarics, boletes, some polypores, tooth fungi, and some ascomycetes.

The word pileus comes from the Latin for a type of felt cap.

== Classification ==
Pilei can be formed in various shapes, and the shapes can change over the course of the developmental cycle of a fungus. The most familiar pileus shape is hemispherical or convex. Convex pilei often continue to expand as they mature until they become flat. Many well-known species have a convex pileus, including the button mushroom, various Amanita species and boletes.

Some, such as the parasol mushroom, have distinct bosses or umbos and are described as umbonate. An umbo is a knobby protrusion at the center of the cap. Some fungi, such as chanterelles have a funnel- or trumpet-shaped appearance. In these cases the pileus is termed infundibuliform.

Campanulate (bell-shaped)

Conical

Convex

Depressed

Flat

Infundibuliform

Offset

Ovate

Umbilicate

Umbonate

== See also ==
- Lamella
- Stipe
