= List of Agaricaceae genera =

This is a list of genera in the mushroom-forming fungus family Agaricaceae.

== Genera ==
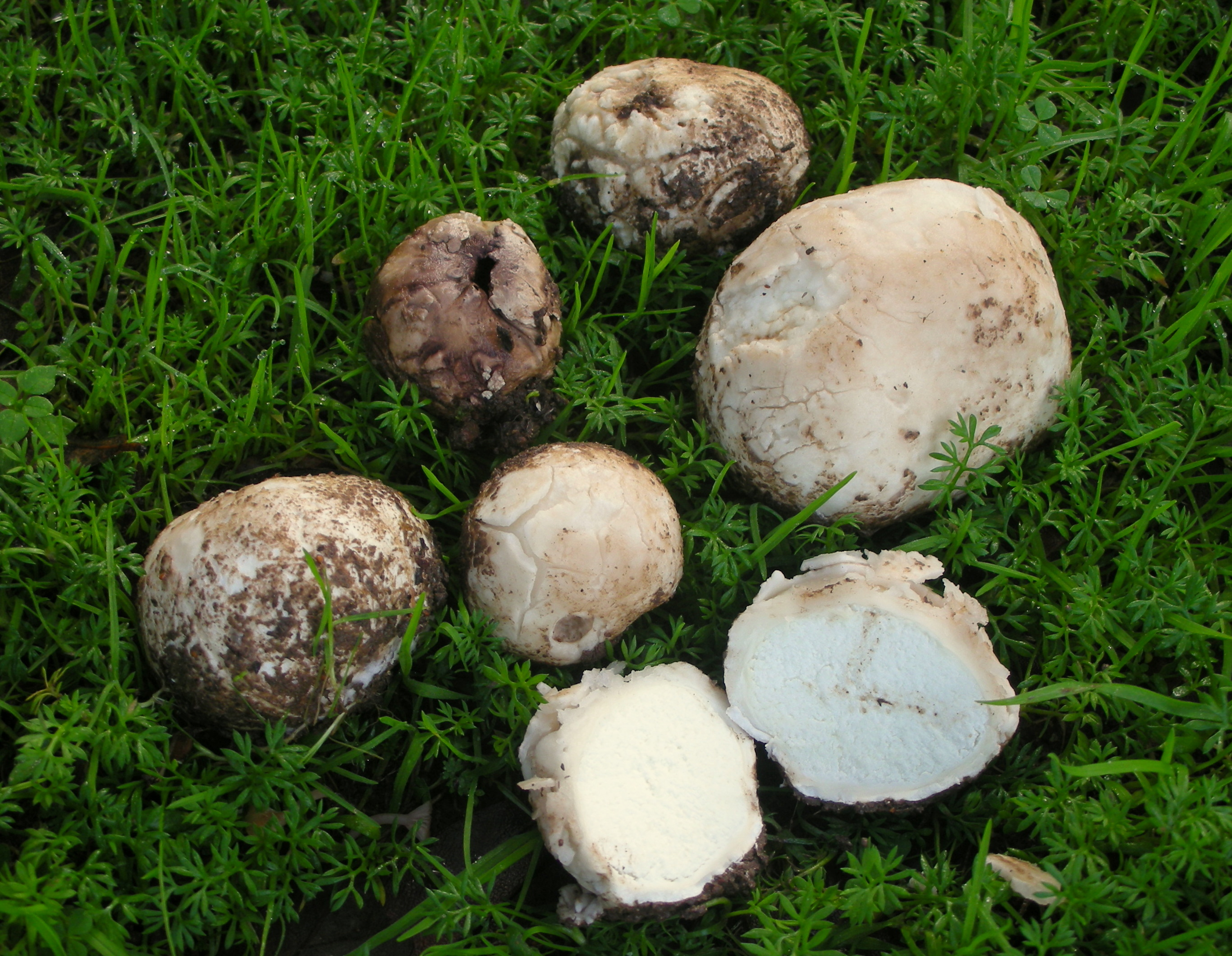
Bovista plumbea

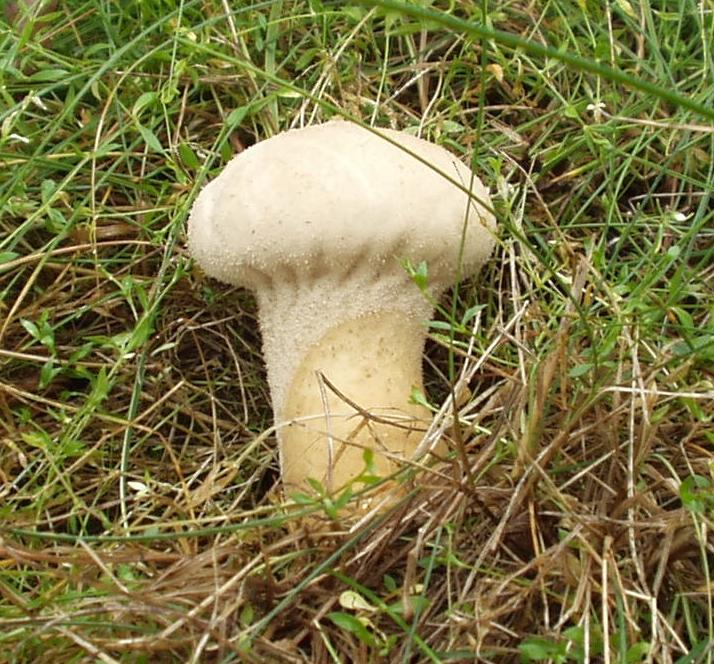
Calvatia excipuliformis

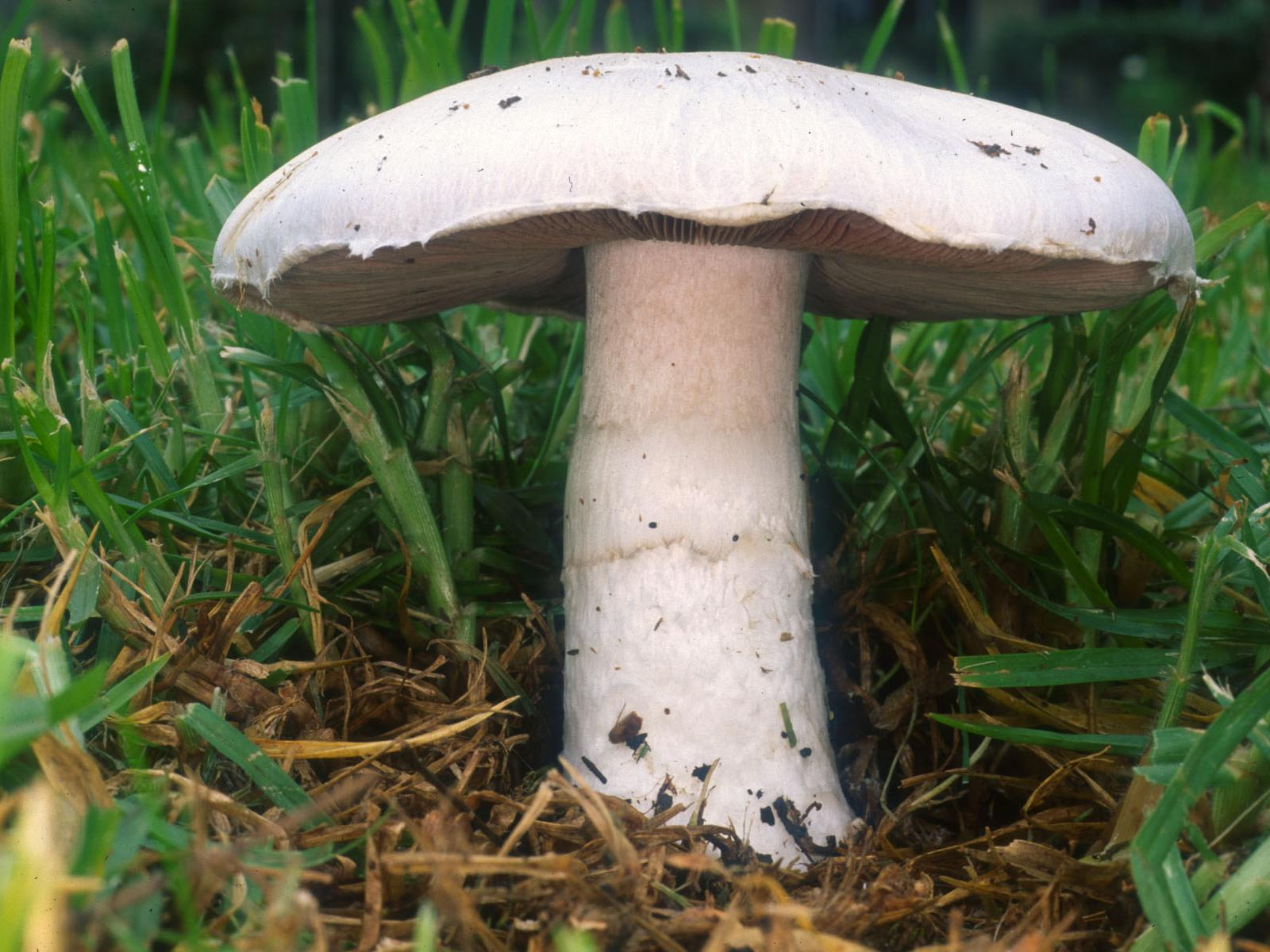
Agaricus campestris

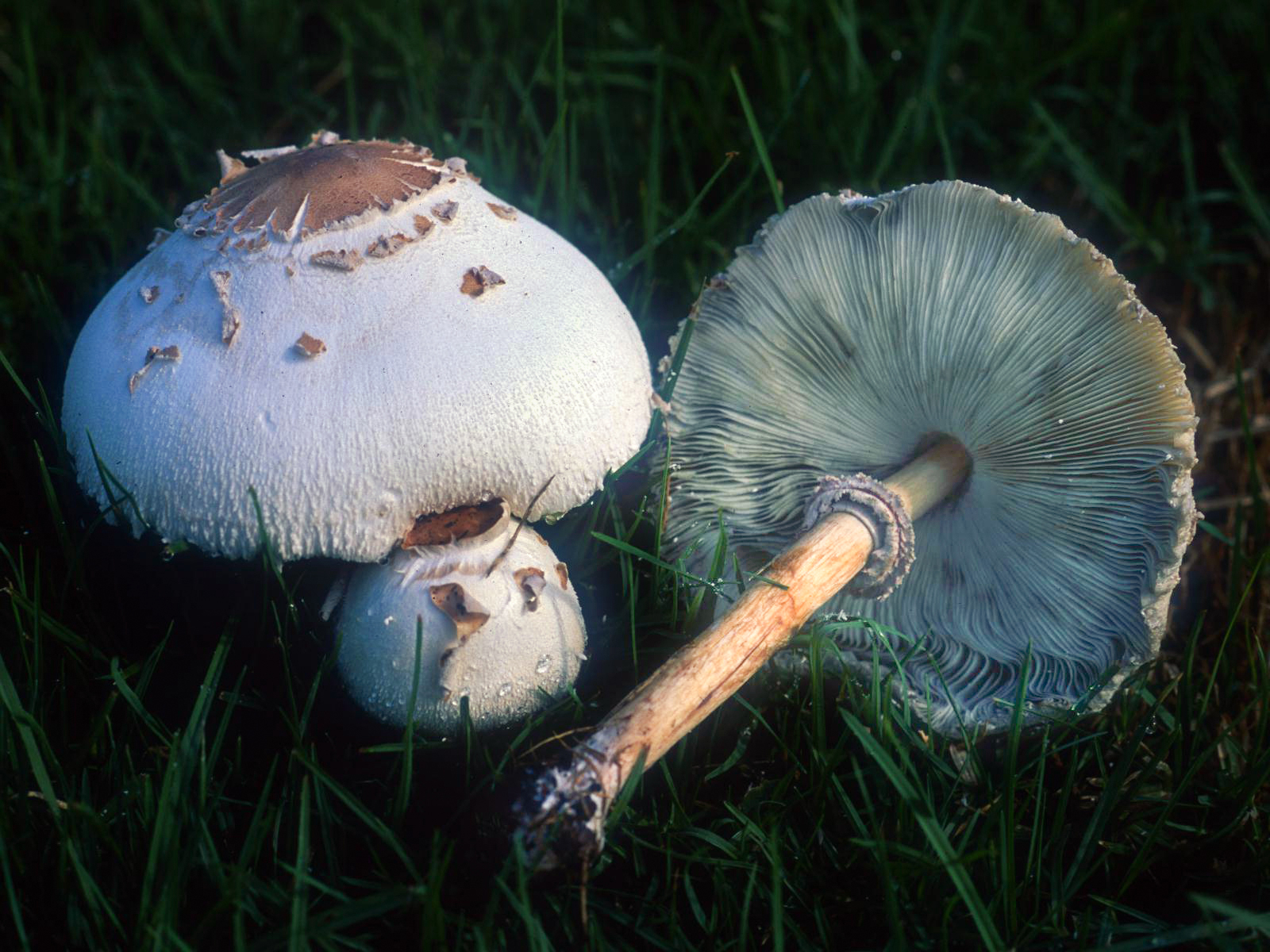
Chlorophyllum molybdites

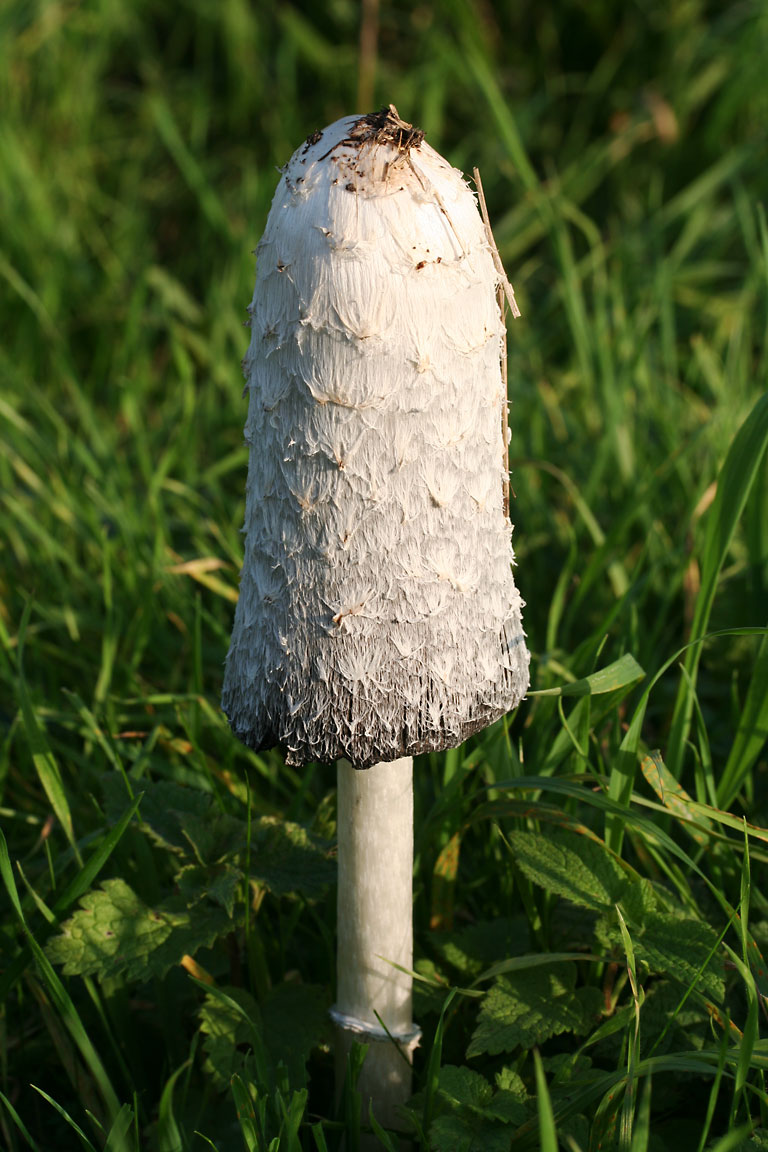
Coprinus comatus

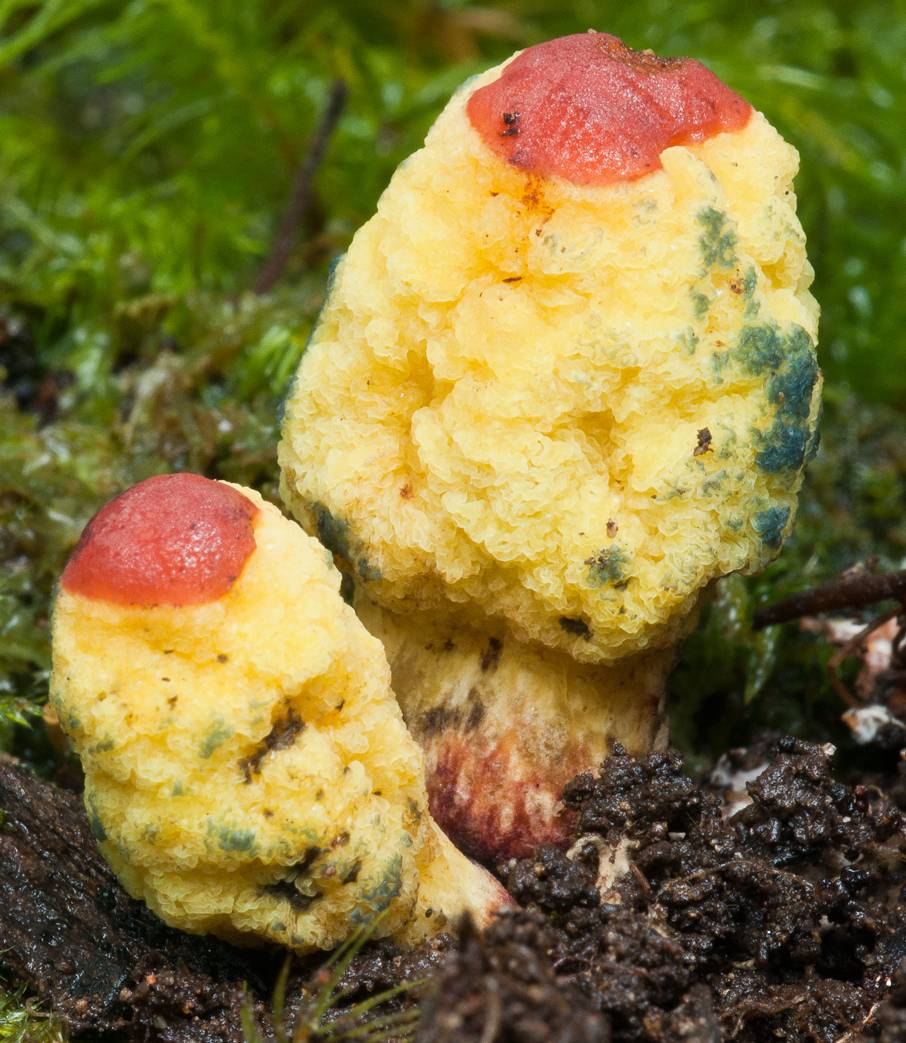
Gymnogaster boletoides

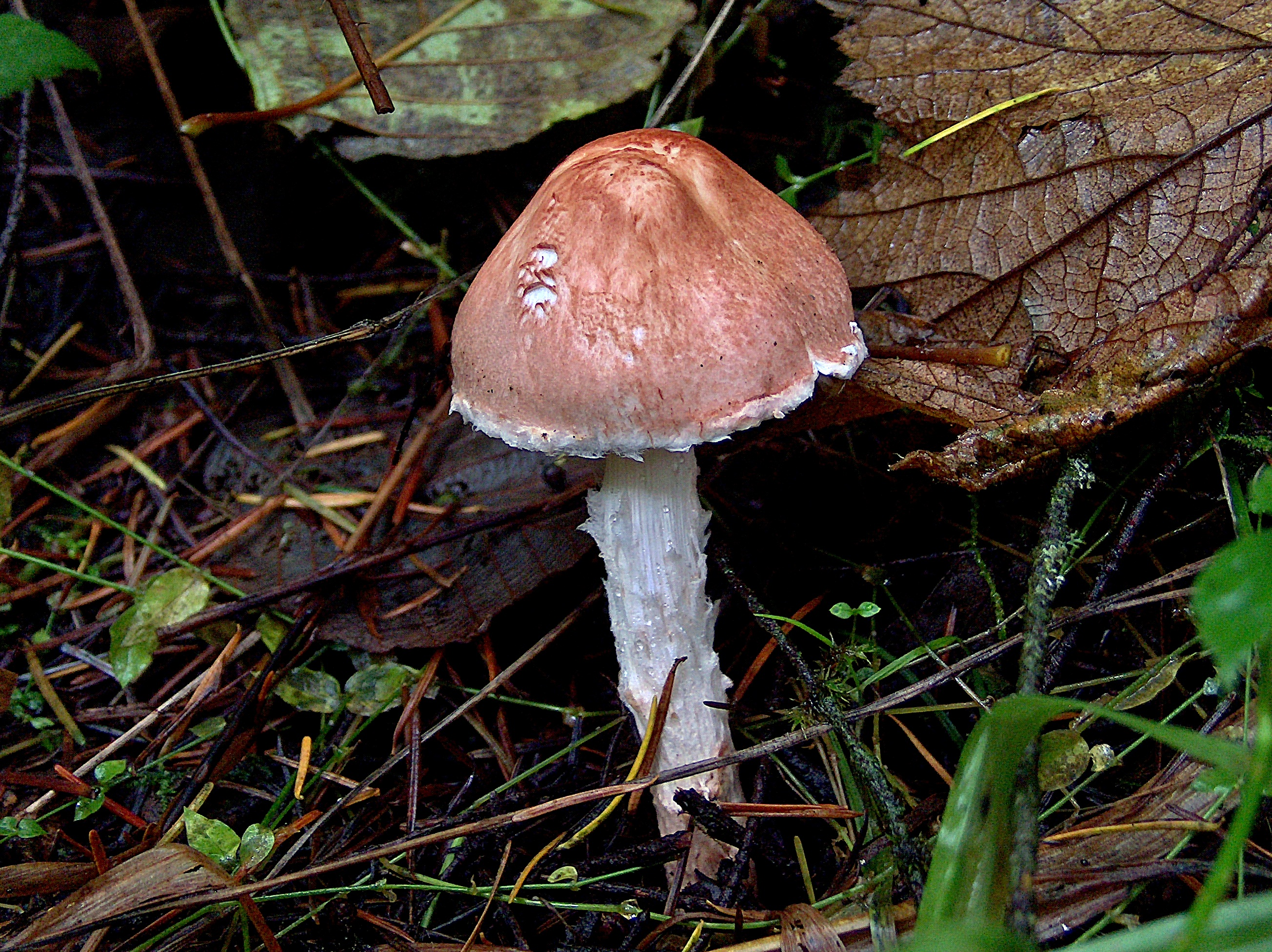
Lepiota subincarnata

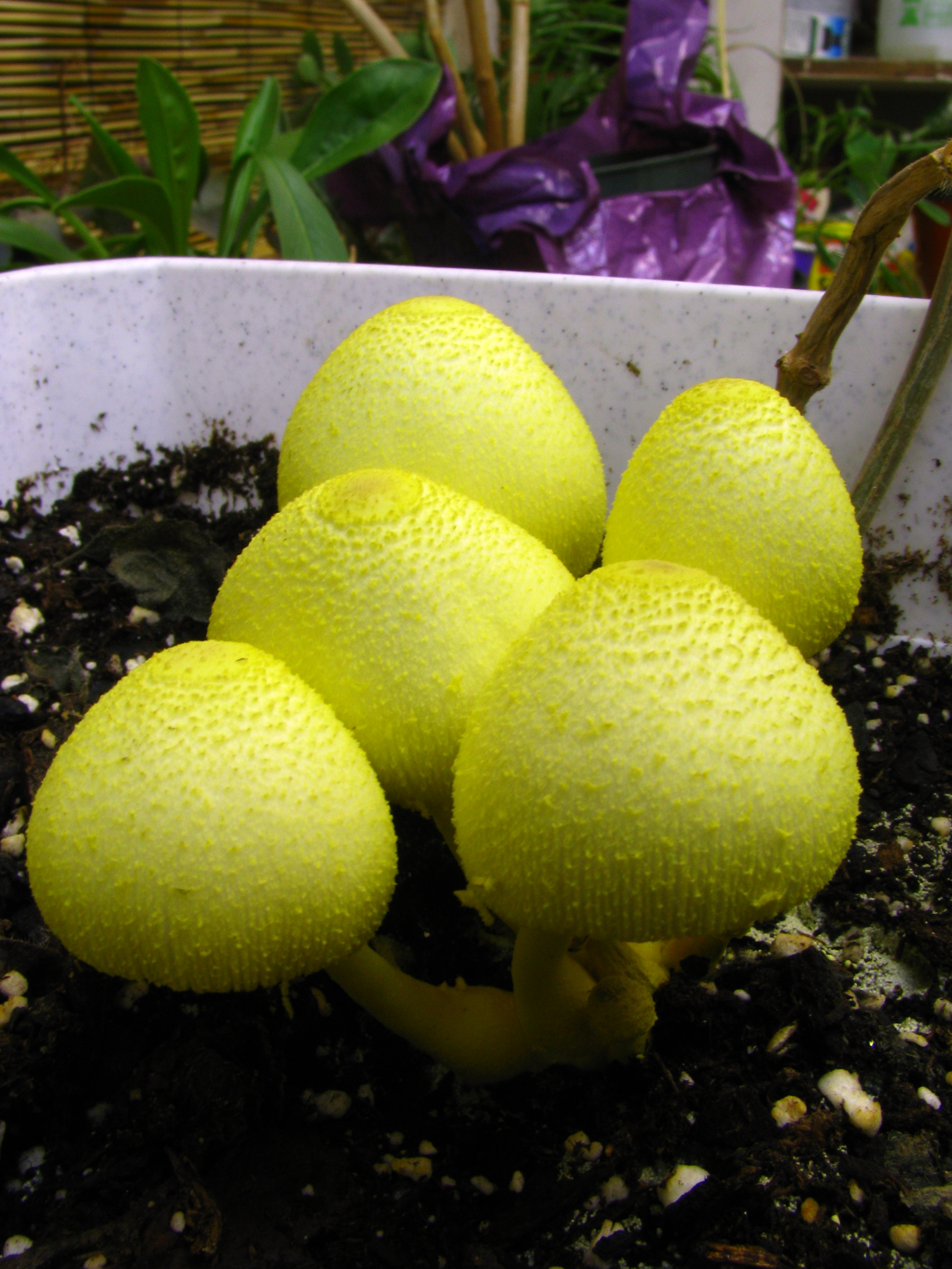
Leucocoprinus birnbaumii

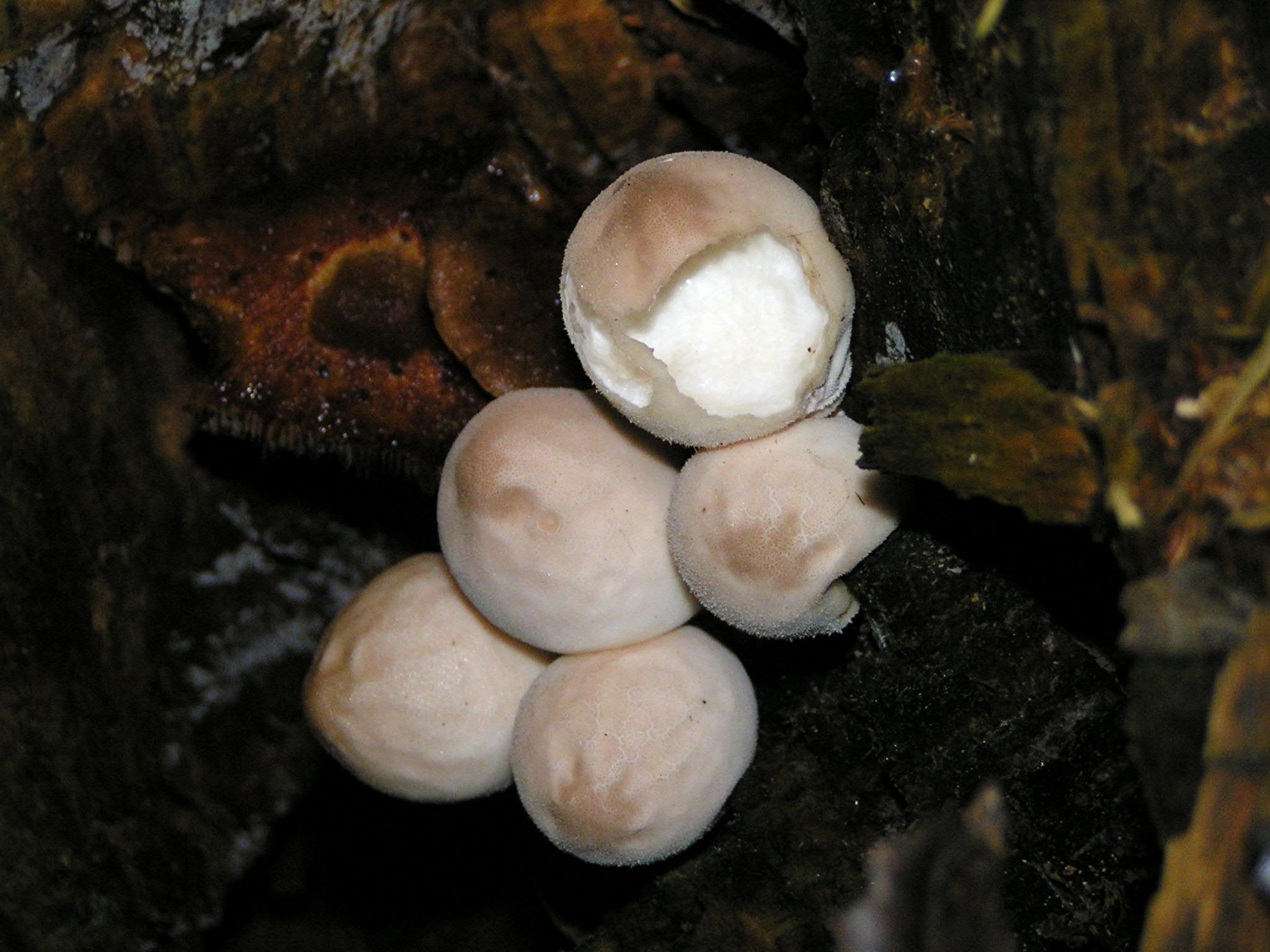
Lycoperdon pyriforme

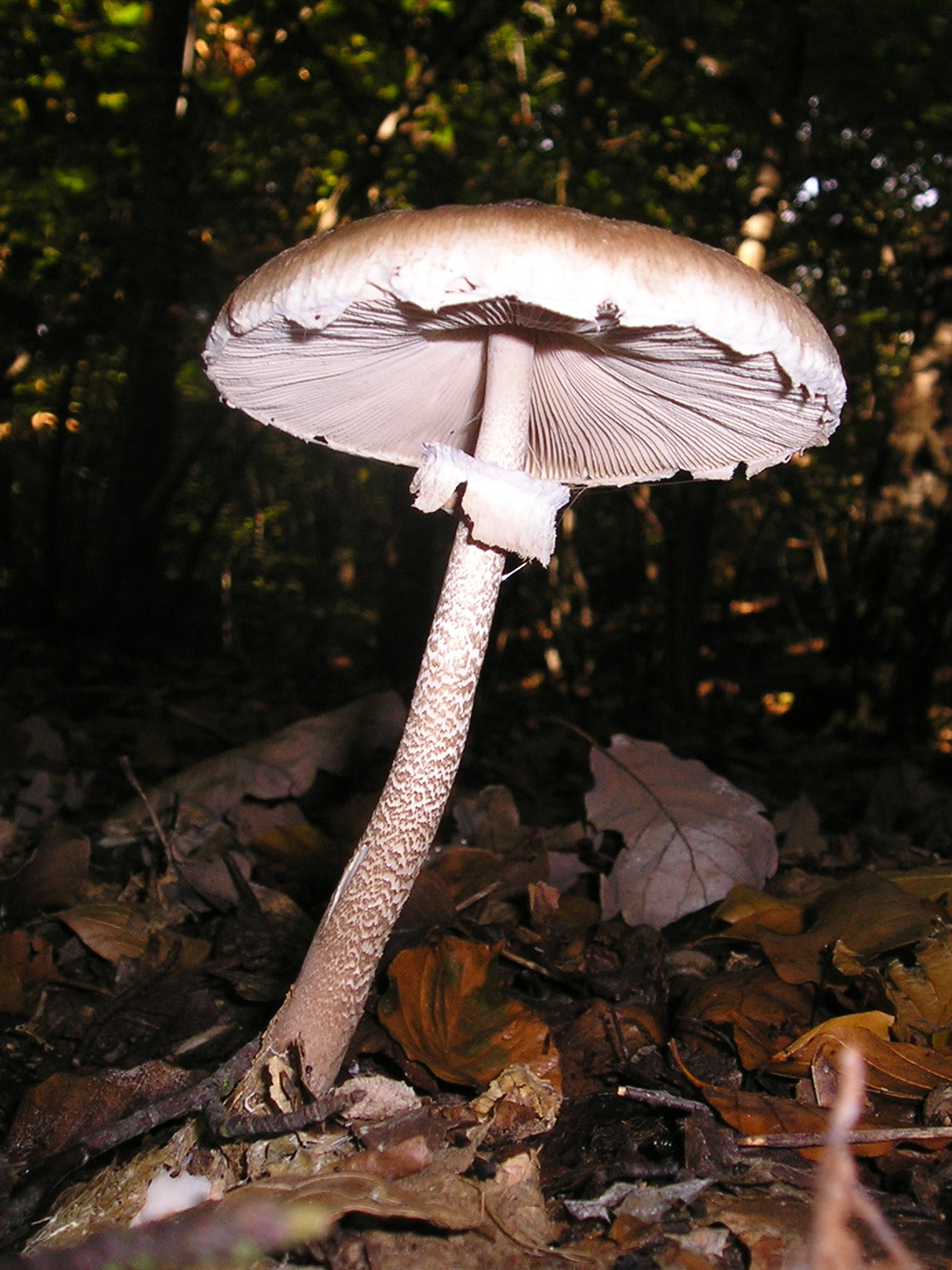
Macrolepiota procera

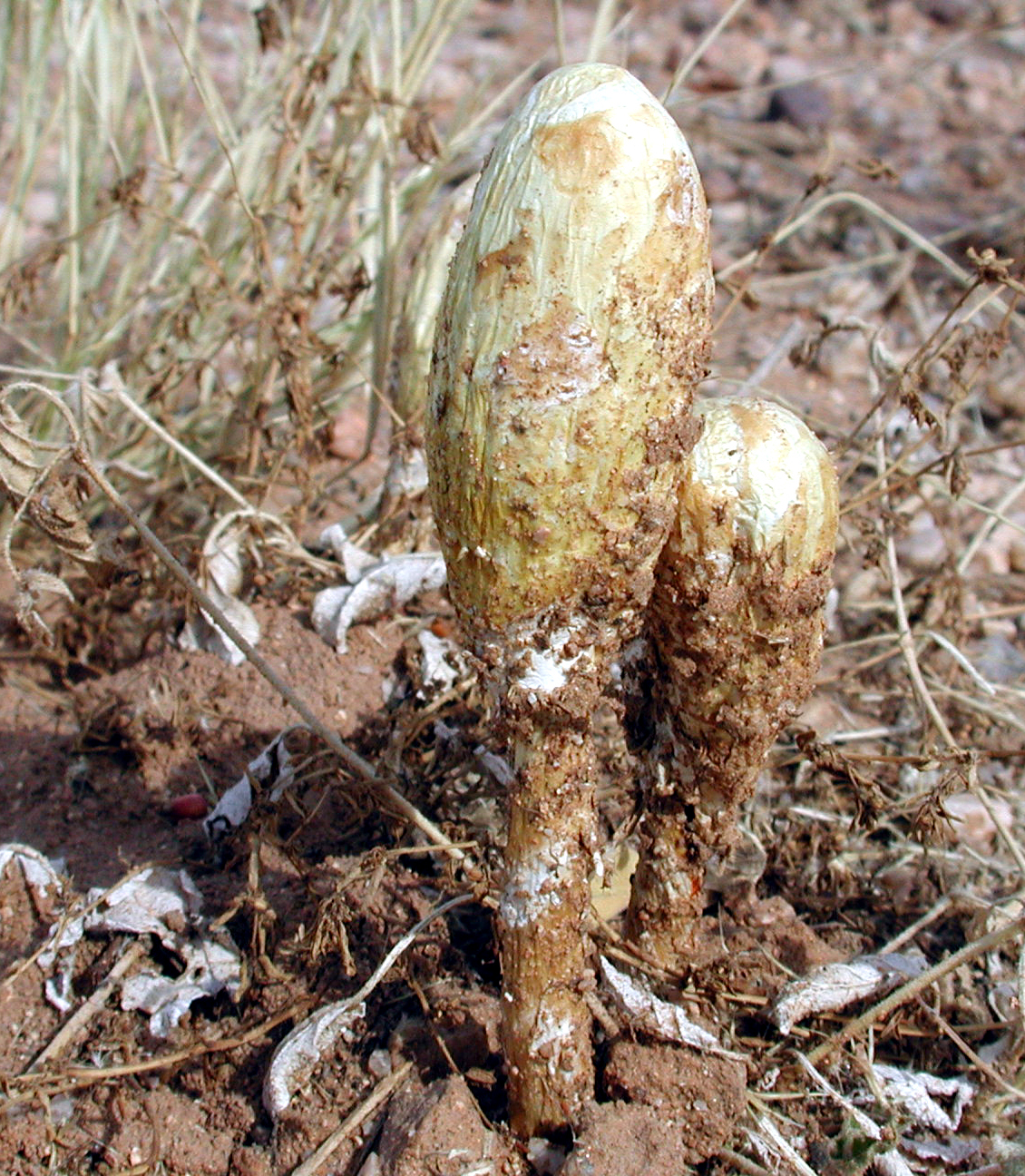
Podaxis pistillaris

Genus Authority	Year	Type species	# of species	Distribution
Abstoma; G.Cunn.	1926	Abstoma purpureum (Lloyd) G.Cunn.	7	Americas
Acutocapillitium; P.Ponce de León	1976	Acutocapillitium torrendii (Lloyd) P.Ponce de León	3	Neotropical
Agaricus; L.:Fr.	1753	Agaricus campestris L.:Fr.	ca. 200	Mostly temperate
Allopsalliota; Nauta & Bas	1999 ("1998") (Note: Conventional mean to indicate that the taxonomic date of publication for the purpose of priority is different from the date given by the work itself.)	Allopsalliota geesterani (Bas & Heinem.) Nauta & Bas	1	Netherlands
Arachnion; Schwein.:Fr.	1822	Arachnion album Schwein.:Fr.	6	Subtropical
Attamyces (Note: This genus' single species is the anamorph to Leucocoprinus gongylophorus.); Kreisel	1972	Attamyces bromatificus Kreisel	1	Cuba
Barcheria; T.Lebel	2004	Barcheria willisiana T.Lebel	1	Australia
Battarrea; Pers.:Pers.	1801	Battarrea phalloides (Dicks.) Pers.:Pers.	3	
Battarreoides; T.Herrera	1953	Battarreoides potosinus (Note: Now treated as Battarreoides diguetii (Pat. & Har.) R.Heim & T.Herrera.); T.Herrera	1	North America
Bovista; Pers.:Pers.	1794	Bovista plumbea Pers.:Pers.	50+	
Bovistella; Morgan	1892	Bovistella ohiensis (Ellis & Morgan) Morgan	1	
Calbovista; Morse ex M.T.Seidl	1995	Calbovista subsculpta Morse ex M.T.Seidl	1	United States
Calvatia; Fr.	1849	Calvatia craniiformis (Schwein.) Fr. ex De Toni	ca. 40	
Chamaemyces; Battara ex Earle	1909 ("1906")	Chamaemyces fracidus (Note: The precise identity of this species is subject to debate (Didukh & al., Mycol. Balc., 1:89–94, 2004).) (Fr.) Donk	ca. 4	Northern hemisphere
Chlamydopus; Speg.	1898	Chlamydopus clavatus Speg.	1	Deserts worldwide
Chlorolepiota; Sathe & S.D.Deshp.	1979	Chlorolepiota mahabaleshwarensis Sathe & S.D.Deshp.	1	India
Chlorophyllum; Massee	1898	Chlorophyllum esculentum (Note: The current name for this species is Chlorophyllum molybdites.); Massee	16	
Clarkeinda; Kuntze	1891	Clarkeinda pedilia (Note: A later synonym of Clarkeinda trachodes.); Berk. & Broome	5	
Clavogaster; Henn.	1896	Clavogaster novozelandicus Henn.	1	New Zealand
Coccobotrys (Note: Species in this genus are anamorph of Lepiota species.); Boud. & Pat.	1900	Coccobotrys xylophilus (Fr.:Fr.) Boud. & Pat.	2	Europe, Chile
Coniolepiota; Vellinga	2011	Coniolepiota sponghodes (Berk. & Broome) Vellinga	1	Southeast Asia, Sri Lanka
Constricta; R.Heim & Mel.-Howell	1965	Constricta africana (Note: The name Constricta africana is invalid under article 34.2 of the Vienna code (2005), as it was simultaneous published in two other genera. Meléndez-Howell ascribe the genus to a previous publication by Heim, and it is not clear whether that makes the genus invalid too.); R.Heim & Mel.-Howell	1	Ivory Coast
Coprinus; Pers.	1797	Coprinus comatus (O.F.Müll.:Fr.) Pers.	c. 10	
Crucispora; E.Horak	1971	Crucispora naucorioides E.Horak	2	New Zealand, Asia
Cystoderma (Note: Cystoderma and Cystodermella are known to fall outside Agaricaceae, possibly with Phaeolepiota and Squamanita (Matheny & Griffith, Mycoscience, 51(6):456-461, 2010). It is unlikely a family name will be coined until the position of Squamanita is resolved, as that genus is the type for Squamanitaceae Jülich (Biblioth. Mycol., 85:390, 1981).); Fayod	1889	Cystoderma amianthinum (Scop.) Fayod	ca. 35	
Cystodermella; Harmaja	2002	Cystodermella granulosa (Batsch) Harmaja	12	
Cystolepiota; Singer	1952	Cystolepiota constricta Singer	10	
Disciseda; Czern.	1845	Disciseda collabescens Czern.	15	
Echinoderma (Locq. ex Bon) Bon	1991	Echinoderma asperum	12	
Endolepiotula; Singer	1963 ("1962")	Endolepiotula ruizlealii Singer	1	Argentina
Endoptychum; Czern.	1845	Chlorophyllum agaricoides (Note: Endoptychum agaricoides has been found to fall within Chlorophyllum, and Endoptychum was subsequently been rejected to protect Chlorophyllum. The genus is listed here because the correct placement for the remaining species is not yet known.) (Czern.) Vellinga	4	Australia, United States
Eriocybe; Vellinga	2011	Eriocybe chionea Vellinga	1	Thailand
Floccularia (Note: This genus might belong to the same clade as Cystoderma and Cystodermella (Kirk & al, 2010:259; Matheny & al., Mycologia 98(6):982–95, 2006)); Pouzar	1957	Floccularia straminea (Krombh.) Pouzar	6	
Gasterellopsis; Routien	1940	Gasterellopsis silvicola Routien	1	United States
Gastropila (Note: a replacement name for Carlos Luigi Spegazzini's Pila (Rev. Chil. Hist. Nat., 25:77, 1923), an illegitimate homonym of Pila Bertrand & Renault (Bull. Soc. Hist. Nat. Autun, 5:31, 1892), a genus of Permian algae.); Homrich & J.E.Wright	1973	Gastropila fragilis (Lév.) Homrich & J.E.Wright	4	Americas
Glyptoderma; R.Heim & Perr.-Bertr.	1971	Glyptoderma coelatum (Pat. ex R.Heim) R.Heim & Perr.-Bertr.	1	Neotropics
Gymnogaster; J.W.Cribb	1956	Gymnogaster boletoides J.W.Cribb	1	Australia
Gyrophragmium; Mont.	1843	Gyrophragmium delilei Mont.	1	
Heinemannomyces; Watling	1999 ("1998")	Heinemannomyces splendidissimus Watling	1	Malaysia
Hiatulopsis; Singer & Grinling	1967	Hiatulopsis amara (Beeli) Singer & Grinling	2	Brazil, Congo
Holocotylon; Lloyd	1906	Holocotylon brandegeeanum Lloyd	3	Tropical North America
Hymenagaricus; Heinem.	1981	Hymenagaricus hymenopileus (Heinem.) Heinem.	10	
Hypogaea; E.Horak	1964 ("1963")	Hypogaea brunnea E.Horak	1	Argentina
Janauaria; Singer	1986	Janauaria amazonica Singer	1	Brazil
Lepiota (Pers.) Gray	1821	Lepiota colubrina (Pers.) Gray (Note: The correct name for this species is Lepiota clypeolaria.)	400+	Worldwide
Leucoagaricus; Locq. ex Singer	1948	Leucoagaricus macrorhizus Singer ex E.Horak	ca. 90	
Leucocoprinus; Pat.	1888	Leucocoprinus cepistipes (Sowerby:Fr.) Pat.	ca. 40	
Lycogalopsis; E.Fisch.	1886	Lycogalopsis solmsii E.Fisch.	1	Tropics worldwide
Lycoperdon; Pers.	1801	Lycoperdon perlatum Pers.:Pers.	ca. 50	
Lycoperdopsis; Henn.	1900	Lycoperdopsis arcyrioides Henn. & E.Nyman	1	Tropical Asia
Macrolepiota; Singer	1948	Macrolepiota procera (Scop.:Fr.) Singer	ca. 40	
Melanophyllum; Velen.	1921	Melanophyllum canali Velen. (Note: The species is currently treated as Melanophyllum haematospermum.)	3	
Metraria; Cooke & Massee	1891	Metraria insignis Cooke & Massee ex Sacc.	2	Australia, Niger
Metrodia; Raithelh.	1971	Metrodia collybioides Raithelh.	2	Argentina
Micropsalliota; Höhn.	1914	Micropsalliota pseudovolvulata Höhn.	ca. 40	
Montagnea; Fr.	1836	Montagnea arenaria (DC.:Fr.) Zeller (Note: The species fall within Montagnea candollei.)	5	
Morganella; Zeller	1948	Morganella mexicana Zeller	9	
Mycenastrum; Desv.	1842	Mycenastrum corium (Guers.) Desv.	1	
Mycocalia; J.T.Palmer	1961	Mycocalia denudata (Fr.) J.T.Palmer	7	
Neosecotium; Singer & A.H.Sm.	1960	Neosecotium macrosporum (Lloyd) Singer & A.H.Sm.	2	Africa, North America
Panaeolopsis; Singer	1969	Panaeolopsis sanmartiniana Singer	4	
Phaeopholiota; Locq. & Sarwal	1983	Phaeopholiota crinipellis Locq. & Sarwal	1	India
Phlebonema; R.Heim	1929	Phlebonema chrysotingens R.Heim	1	Madagascar
Phyllogaster; Pegler	1969	Phyllogaster pholiotoides Pegler	1	Ghana
Podaxis; Desv.	1809	Podaxis senegalensis Desv.	10	
Pseudoauricularia; Kobayasi	1982 ("1981")	Pseudoauricularia papuana Kobayasi	1	Papua New Guinea
Queletia; Fr.	1872 ("1871")	Queletia mirabilis Fr.	2	
Rugosospora; Heinem.	1973	Rugosospora ochraceobadia (Beeli) Heinem.	2	Africa, Colombia, Mexico
Schinzinia; Fayod	1889	Schinzinia pustulosa Fayod	1	East Africa
Secotium; Kunze	1840	Secotium gueinzii Kunze	ca. 10	
Singerina; Sathe & S.D.Deshp.	1981 ("1980")	Singerina indica Sathe & S.D.Deshp.	1	India
Smithiogaster; J.E.Wright	1975	Smithiogaster volvoagaricus J.E.Wright	1	Argentina
Smithiomyces; Singer	1944	Smithiomyces mexicanus (Murrill) Singer	2	Neotropics
Termiticola; E.Horak	1979	Termiticola rubescens E.Horak	1	Papua New Guinea
Tulostoma; Pers.	1801	Tulostoma brumale Pers.:Pers.	102	widespread
Vascellum; F.Šmarda	1958	Vascellum depressum (Bonord.) F.Šmarda	17	
Verrucospora (Note: Authorities differ whether this genus or the ascomycete genus Verrucispora (Capnodiales), has priority, as both were apparently published in December 1967. If Verrucispora predates Verrucospora, the correct name for the latter is Horakia Oberw. (Sydowia, 28(1-6):359, 1975).); E.Horak	1967	Verrucospora verrucospora (Beeli) E. Horak (Note: The nomen novum Verrucospora vulgaris has been coined to replace this name, which is invalid under the ICBN.)	2	Tropical Africa
Xanthagaricus (Heinem.) Little Flower & al.	1997	Xanthagaricus flavidorufus (Berk. & Broome) Little Flower & al.	12	
Xerocoprinus; Maire	1907 ("1906")	Xerocoprinus arenarius (Pat.) Maire	1	Africa

== See also ==
- List of Agaricales families
- List of Agaricales genera
