= Allopsalliota =

Scientific classification
- Kingdom: Fungi
- Division: Basidiomycota
- Class: Agaricomycetes
- Order: Agaricales
- Family: Agaricaceae
- Genus: Allopsalliota; Nauta & Bas (1999)

Type species
- Allopsalliota geesterani (Bas & Heinem.) Nauta & Bas (1999)

Synonyms
- Agaricus geesterani Bas & Heinem. (1986)

Genus of fungi

Allopsalliota is a fungal genus in the family Agaricaceae. A monotypic genus, it consists of the single species Allopsalliota geesterani, found in the Netherlands. The specific epithet honors Dutch mycologist Rudolph Arnold Maas Geesteranus. Allopsalliota was circumscribed in 1998 to contain what was then known as Agaricus geesterani, a species first described in 1986 by Cornelis Bas and Paul Heinemann.

== See also ==
- List of Agaricales genera
- List of Agaricaceae genera
