= Hiatulopsis =

Scientific classification
- Kingdom: Fungi
- Division: Basidiomycota
- Class: Agaricomycetes
- Order: Agaricales
- Family: Agaricaceae
- Genus: Hiatulopsis; Singer & Grinling (1967)

Type species
- Hiatulopsis amara (Beeli) Singer & Grinling (1967)

Species
- H. amara H. aureoflava

Genus of fungi

Hiatulopsis is a genus of two species of fungi in the family Agaricaceae. The genus was circumscribed in 1967 by mycologists K. Grinling and Rolf Singer with H. amara as the type species. H. aureoflava was added to the genus by Singer in 1989.

== See also ==
- List of Agaricaceae genera
- List of Agaricales genera
