= Hiatulopsis aureoflava =

Scientific classification
- Domain: Eukaryota
- Kingdom: Fungi
- Division: Basidiomycota
- Class: Agaricomycetes
- Order: Agaricales
- Family: Agaricaceae
- Genus: Hiatulopsis
- Species: H. aureoflava

Binomial name
- Hiatulopsis aureoflava Singer (1989)

Species of fungus

Hiatulopsis aureoflava Mycological characteristics
- Gills on hymenium
- Cap is ovate or campanulate
- Hymenium is free
- Stipe is bare
- Ecology is saprotrophic
- Edibility is unknown

Hiatulopsis aureoflava is a species of mushroom producing fungus in the family Agaricaceae.

== Taxonomy ==
It was described in 1989 by the German mycologist Rolf Singer who classified it as Hiatulopsis aureoflava.

== Description ==
Hiatulopsis aureoflava is a very small golden yellow mushroom with white flesh.

Cap: 7-11mm wide and ovate to campanulate. The surface is golden with a fine, dense coating of flocculose (woolly) scales and the margins are yellow. Some scales may be removed by rain. Gills: Free to sub-free, crowded and whitish. They are narrow and ascending. Stem: 3.6cm tall and 1.8mm thick tapering to a 4mm wide base where white mycelium may be present but sclerotia are not observed. The surface is yellowish with woolly to powdery scales (flocculose-pulverulent) with a golden base with a tomentose coating. There is no ring or volva. Spores: Ellipsoidal without a germ pore, hyaline, non-amyloid. 7-10 x 5.5-6.5 μm. Basidia: 22-34 x 11-13 μm. Four spored. Smell: Indistinct.

== Etymology ==
The specific epithet aureoflava derives from the Latin aureo meaning golden and flava meaning yellow.

== Habitat and distribution ==
The specimens studied by Singer were found growing solitary or gregariously on the ground in the tropical forests of Brazil, 30km North of Manaus.
