= Queletia =

Scientific classification
- Kingdom: Fungi
- Division: Basidiomycota
- Class: Agaricomycetes
- Order: Agaricales
- Family: Agaricaceae
- Genus: Queletia; Fr. (1872)

Type species
- Queletia mirabilis Fr. (1872)

Genus of fungi

Queletia is a genus of fungi in the family Agaricaceae. The genus was circumscribed by Elias Magnus Fries in 1872. Fruit bodies of Queletia species are sequestrate with a thin outer skin (peridium) and a harder inner skin that breaks into small pieces with age. The genus is named after French mycologist Lucien Quélet (1832–1899).

The genus contains three species:

- Queletia andina J.E. Wright (1989)
- Queletia mirabilis Fr. (1872) (Type species)
- Queletia turcestanica M.Petrov (1929)

Former species:

- Q. laceratum (Ehrenb. ex Fr.) S. Ahmad (1941) now Schizostoma laceratum
- Q. mundkurii S. Ahmad (1941) now Schizostoma mundkurii

== See also ==
- List of Agaricales genera
- List of Agaricaceae genera
