= Endolepiotula =

Scientific classification
- Kingdom: Fungi
- Division: Basidiomycota
- Class: Agaricomycetes
- Order: Agaricales
- Family: Agaricaceae
- Genus: Endolepiotula; Singer (1963)

Type species
- Endolepiotula ruizlealii Singer (1963)

Genus of fungi

Endolepiotula is a fungal genus in the family Agaricaceae. This is a monotypic genus, containing the single secotioid species Endolepiotula ruizlealii. This fungus was found in Mendoza Province, Argentina, growing in sandy soil in somewhat dry environment after rainfall.

== See also ==
- List of Agaricales genera
- List of Agaricaceae genera
