= Hypogaea =

Scientific classification
- Kingdom: Fungi
- Division: Basidiomycota
- Class: Agaricomycetes
- Order: Agaricales
- Family: Agaricaceae
- Genus: Hypogaea; E.Horak (1964)

Type species
- Hypogaea brunnea E.Horak (1964)

Synonyms
- Setchelliogaster brunneus (E.Horak) Singer (1971)

Genus of fungi

Hypogaea is a fungal genus in the family Agaricaceae. It is a monotypic genus, containing the single secotioid species Hypogaea brunnea, described as new to science in 1963 by mycologist Egon Horak.

== See also ==
- List of Agaricaceae genera
- List of Agaricales genera
