= Neosecotium =

Scientific classification
- Kingdom: Fungi
- Division: Basidiomycota
- Class: Agaricomycetes
- Order: Agaricales
- Family: Agaricaceae
- Genus: Neosecotium; Singer & A.H.Sm. (1960)

Type species
- Neosecotium macrosporum (Lloyd) Singer & A.H.Sm. (1960)

Species
- N. africanum; N. macrosporum

Genus of fungi

Neosecotium is a genus of fungi in the family Agaricaceae. The genus was circumscribed in 1960 by American mycologists Rolf Singer and Alexander H. Smith. The type species, N. macrosporum, previously only known from the US, was recorded in Mexico in 2012.

== See also ==
- List of Agaricaceae genera
- List of Agaricales genera
