= Janauaria =

Scientific classification
- Kingdom: Fungi
- Division: Basidiomycota
- Class: Agaricomycetes
- Order: Agaricales
- Family: Agaricaceae
- Genus: Janauaria; Singer (1986)

Type species
- Janauaria amazonica Singer (1986)

Genus of fungi

Janauaria is a fungal genus in the family Agaricaceae. This is a monotypic genus, containing the single species Janauaria amazonica, found in Brazil and described as new to science in 1986 by mycologist Rolf Singer.

== See also ==
- List of Agaricaceae genera
- List of Agaricales genera
