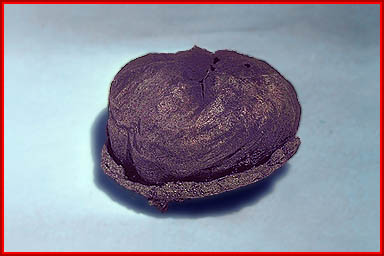
- Abstoma Townei

Scientific classification
- Kingdom: Fungi
- Division: Basidiomycota
- Class: Agaricomycetes
- Order: Agaricales
- Family: Agaricaceae
- Genus: Abstoma; G.Cunn. (1926)

Type species
- Abstoma purpureum (Lloyd) G.Cunn. (1926)

Species
- A. fibulaceum; A. friabile; A. pampeanum; A. purpureum; A. townei; A. reticulatum; A. verrucisporum

= Abstoma =

Genus of fungi

Abstoma is a genus of gasteroid fungi in the family Agaricaceae. The type species, A. purpureum, was described from New Zealand by mycologist Gordon Herriot Cunningham in 1926. Wright and colleagues transferred A. stuckertii (originally Bovista stuckertii Speg.) to the genus in 1990, but Moreno et al. proposed a new combination Disciseda stuckertii in 2007. A. fimbrialis was described from Baja California, Mexico, in 1992. A. townei is found in western and southwest USA and in west Argentina, while A. reticulatum occurs in Australia and the western and southwestern USA.

== See also ==
- List of Agaricaceae genera
