= Rugosospora =

Scientific classification
- Kingdom: Fungi
- Division: Basidiomycota
- Class: Agaricomycetes
- Order: Agaricales
- Family: Agaricaceae
- Genus: Rugosospora; Heinem. (1973)

Type species
- Rugosospora ochraceobadia (Beeli) Heinem. (1973)

Species
- R. ochraceobadia R. pseudorubiginosa

Genus of fungi

Rugosospora is a genus of fungi in the family Agaricaceae. The genus contains two species: R. ochraceobadia, found in Africa, and R. pseudorubiginosa, found in Colombia and Mexico. These species have fruit bodies (mushrooms) with free gills, a white spore print, and a ring on the stipe. Rugosospora was circumscribed by Belgian mycologist Paul Heinemann in 1973.

== See also ==
- List of Agaricales genera
- List of Agaricaceae genera
