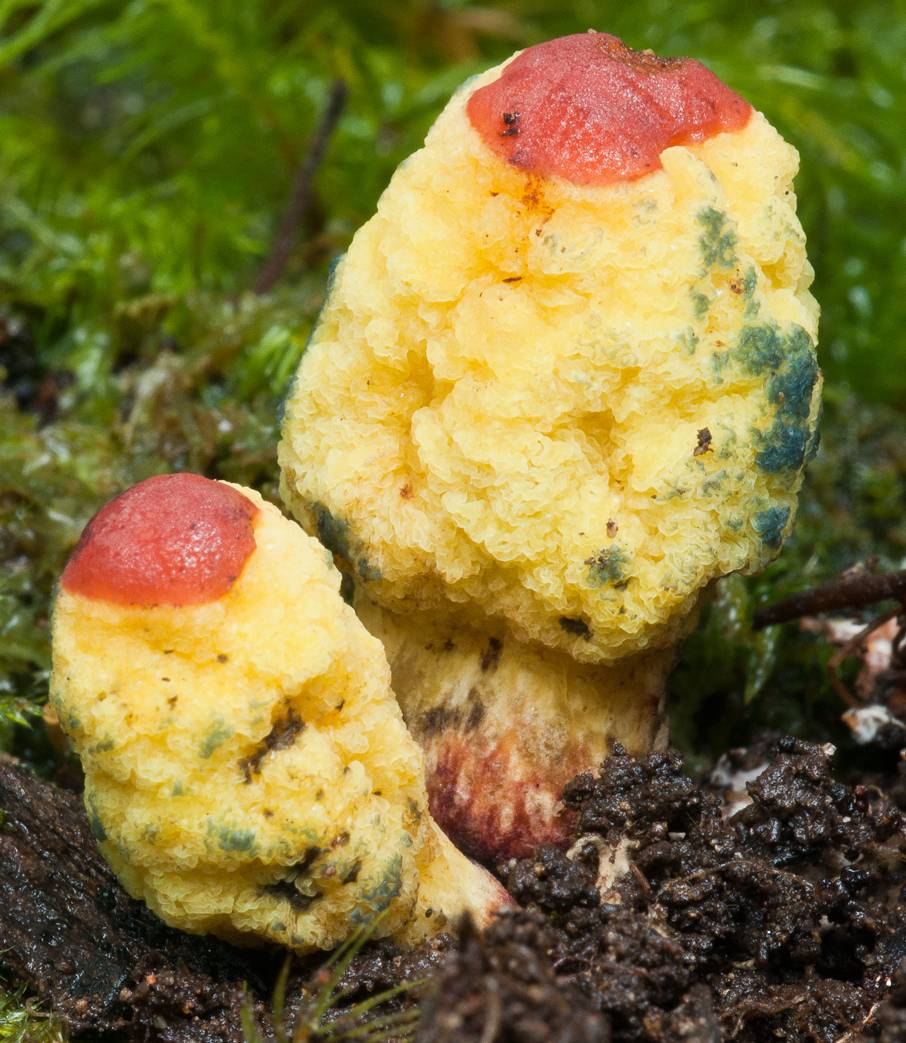
- From New South Wales, Australia

Conservation status
- Vulnerable (IUCN 3.1)

Scientific classification
- Kingdom: Fungi
- Division: Basidiomycota
- Class: Agaricomycetes
- Order: Agaricales
- Family: Agaricaceae
- Genus: Gymnogaster; J.W.Cribb (1956)
- Species: G. boletoides

Binomial name
- Gymnogaster boletoides J.W.Cribb (1956)

= Gymnogaster =

Genus of fungi

Gymnogaster is a genus of fungi in the family Boletaceae. It is a monotypic genus, containing the single secotioid species Gymnogaster boletoides, found in Australia. The fungus produces bright yellow fruit bodies with a light brown internal gleba, and the fruit bodies turn blue then dark brown after bruising or handling.

== Taxonomy and classification ==
The genus was circumscribed by Joan Cribb in 1956, based on specimens she found growing in the woods of Mount Glorious, Queensland in February the previous year. The genus differs from the similar Secotium in that it lacks a peridium. Cribb initially placed the genus within the Secotiaceae family, but this has since been made synonymous with the Agaricaceae. In his second (1962) edition of his influential Agaricales in Modern Taxonomy, Rolf Singer placed Gymnogaster in the Gastroboletaceae, (a family that has since been folded into the Boletaceae), in which he also included the genera Austrogaster, Truncocolumella, Gautieria, Chamonixia, Brauniellula, and Gastroboletus.

== Description ==
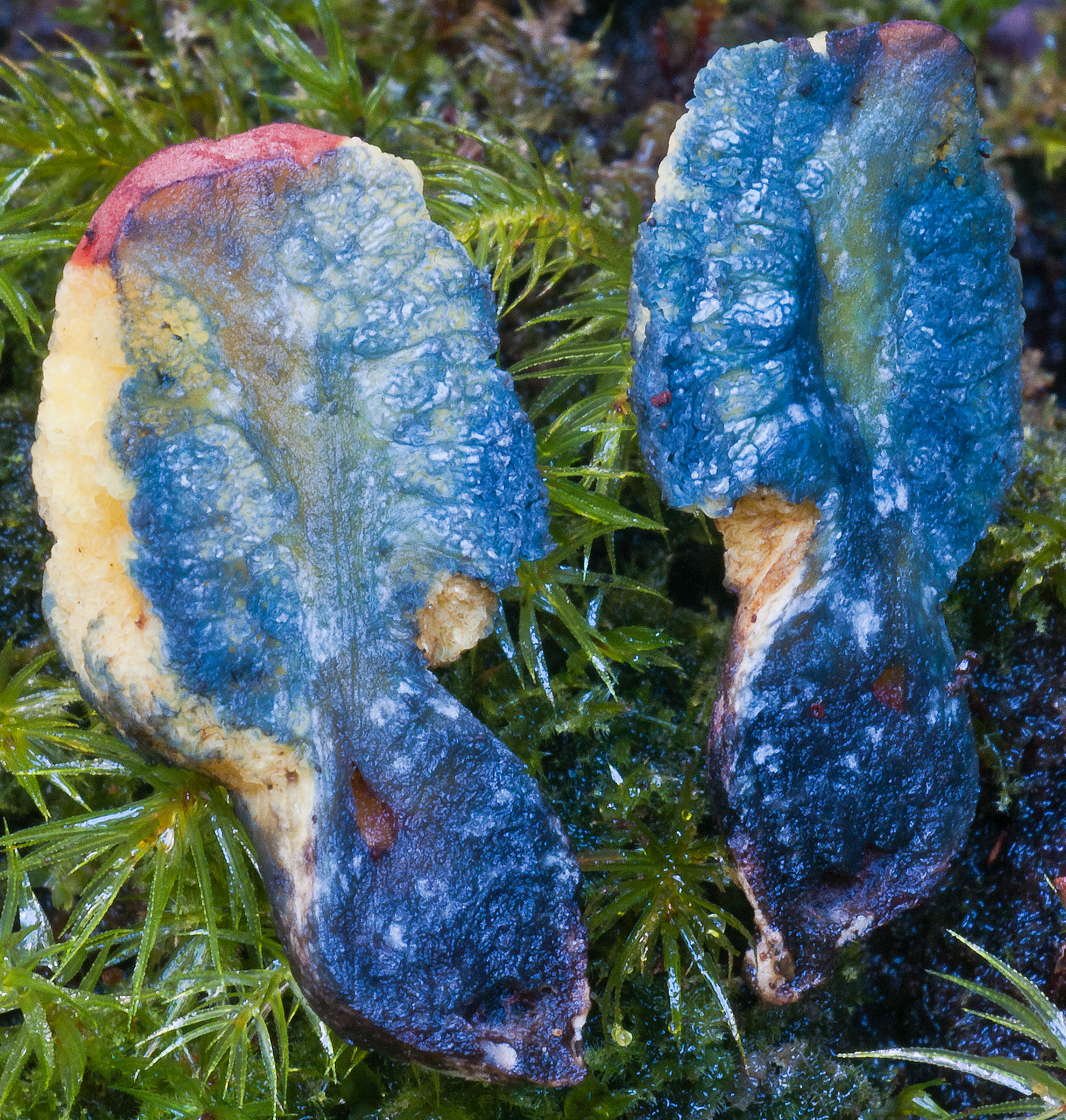
A fruit body sliced in half reveals the characteristic bluing reaction.

The fruit body is shaped roughly like a flattened sphere, about 2.5 cm (1.0 in) wide and 2.2 cm (0.9 in) high (excluding the stipe). The base of the fruit body is depressed and rounded, yellow; at the apex, the fixed part is russet red. The stipe is yellow on the outside but white within, projecting into the fruit body; it is 4–5 mm (0.16–0.20 in) long, 7 mm (0.28 in) thick, and solid. The columella (a central sterile portion) is white and 7 mm (0.28 in) wide. The gleba is cellular, pale brown, and composed of labyrinthoid cells that are up to 1 mm in diameter. The flesh is 50–70 μm thick, with a wide expanse of woven hyphae. The spores are elliptical or ovate, brown, smooth, and measure 9.5–13 by 5.6–7.0 μm. The basidia are four-spored.

Fruit bodies of G. boletoides will turn bright blue immediately upon being handled or bruised, and slowly change color to dark brown. This is similar to the color reaction that occurs in several bolete mushrooms.

== Habitat and distribution ==
Gymnogaster boletoides is suspected to be an ectomycorrhizal species. The fungus grows in wooded areas, and has been collected in Mount Glorious, Queensland, including Lamington National Park.
