= Termiticola =

Scientific classification
- Kingdom: Fungi
- Division: Basidiomycota
- Class: Agaricomycetes
- Order: Agaricales
- Family: Agaricaceae
- Genus: Termiticola; E.Horak (1979)

Type species
- Termiticola rubescens E.Horak (1979)

Genus of fungi

Termiticola is a fungal genus in the family Agaricaceae. It is a monotypic genus, containing the single species Termiticola rubescens, found in Papua New Guinea.

== See also ==
- List of Agaricaceae genera
- List of Agaricales genera
