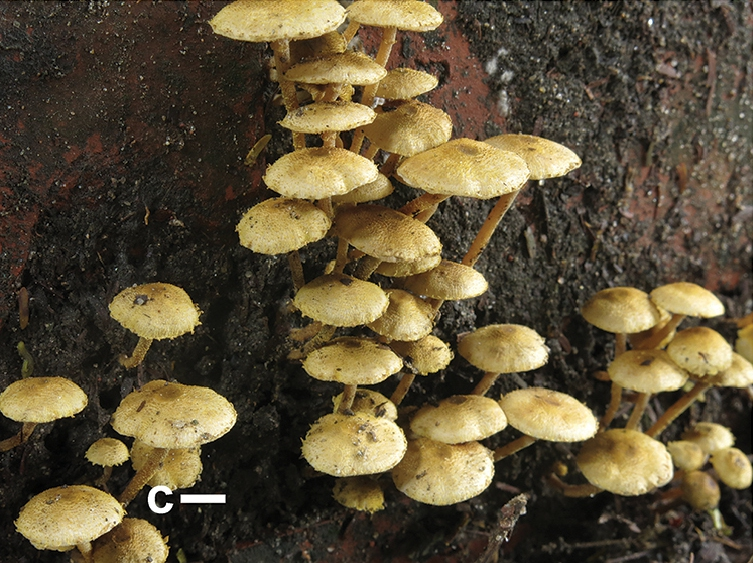

Scientific classification
- Kingdom: Fungi
- Division: Basidiomycota
- Class: Agaricomycetes
- Order: Agaricales
- Family: Agaricaceae
- Genus: Xanthagaricus
- Species: X. necopinatus

Binomial name
- Xanthagaricus necopinatus Iqbal Hosen, T.H. Li, & G.M. Gates (2018)

= Xanthagaricus necopinatus =

Species of fungus

Xanthagaricus necopinatus is a species of the fungal family Agaricaceae. This species is the first generic report for Bangladesh. It was found in Chondrima Uddan, Dhaka district of Bangladesh.
