= Gasterellopsis =

Scientific classification
- Kingdom: Fungi
- Division: Basidiomycota
- Class: Agaricomycetes
- Order: Agaricales
- Family: Agaricaceae
- Genus: Gasterellopsis; Routien (1940)

Type species
- Gasterellopsis silvicola Routien (1940)

Genus of fungi

Gasterellopsis is a fungal genus in the family Agaricaceae. This is a monotypic genus, containing the single species Gasterellopsis silvicola, originally found in East Lansing, Michigan. It is named for its similarity to the genus Gasterella.

== See also ==
- List of Agaricales genera
- List of Agaricaceae genera
