= Phaeopholiota =

Scientific classification
- Kingdom: Fungi
- Division: Basidiomycota
- Class: Agaricomycetes
- Order: Agaricales
- Family: Agaricaceae
- Genus: Phaeopholiota; Locq. & Sarwal (1983)

Type species
- Phaeopholiota crinipellis Locq. & Sarwal (1983)

Genus of fungi

Phaeopholiota is a fungal genus in the family Agaricaceae. A monotypic genus, it contains the single Himalayan species Phaeopholiota crinipellis, described as new to science in 1983.

== See also ==
- List of Agaricaceae genera
- List of Agaricales genera
