= Phlebonema =

Scientific classification
- Kingdom: Fungi
- Division: Basidiomycota
- Class: Agaricomycetes
- Order: Agaricales
- Family: Agaricaceae
- Genus: Phlebonema; R.Heim (1929)

Type species
- Phlebonema chrysotingens R.Heim (1929)

Genus of fungi

Phlebonema is a fungal genus in the family Agaricaceae. It is a monotypic genus, containing the single species Phlebonema chrysotingens, described by Roger Heim in 1929 from Madagascar. According to the Dictionary of the Fungi (10th edition, 2008), the placement of this little-known genus in the Agaricaceae is uncertain.

== See also ==
- List of Agaricaceae genera
- List of Agaricales genera
