= Hymenagaricus =

Scientific classification
- Kingdom: Fungi
- Division: Basidiomycota
- Class: Agaricomycetes
- Order: Agaricales
- Family: Agaricaceae
- Genus: Hymenagaricus; Heinem. (1981)

Type species
- Hymenagaricus hymenopileus (Heinem.) Heinem. (1981)

Genus of fungi

Hymenagaricus is a genus of fungi in the family Agaricaceae. The widespread genus contains species found largely in tropical regions. Hymenagaricus was circumscribedby Belgian mycologist Paul Heinemann in 1981.

The origin of Hymenagaricus has been traced back 51.83 million years ago in Thailand.

== Species ==
- Hymenagaricus alphitochrous (Berk. & Broome) Heinem. 1981
- Hymenagaricus ardosiaecolor (Heinem.) Heinem. 1985
- Hymenagaricus caespitosus D.A.Reid & Eicker 1995 – Africa
- Hymenagaricus calicutensis Heinem. & Little Flower 1984
- Hymenagaricus canoruber (Berk. & Broome) Heinem. & Little Flower 1984
- Hymenagaricus cylindrocystis Heinem. & Little Flower 1984
- Hymenagaricus epipastus (Berk. & Broome) Heinem. & Little Flower 1984 – Sri Lanka
- Hymenagaricus fuscobrunneus D.A.Reid & Eicker 1998 – South Africa
- Hymenagaricus hymenopileus (Heinem.) Heinem. 1981
- Hymenagaricus kivuensis Heinem. 1984
- Hymenagaricus laticystis Heinem. 1985
- Hymenagaricus nigrovinosus (Pegler) Heinem. 1981
- Hymenagaricus nigroviolaceus Heinem. 1985
- Hymenagaricus ochraceoluteus D.A.Reid & Eicker 1998 – South Africa
- Hymenagaricus olivaceus Heinem. 1985
- Hymenagaricus pallidodiscus D.A.Reid & Eicker 1999 – South Africa
- Hymenagaricus rufomarginatus D.A.Reid & Eicker 1998 – South Africa
- Hymenagaricus subaeruginosus (Berk. & Broome) Heinem. & Little Flower 1984
- Hymenagaricus taiwanensis Zhu L.Yang, Z.W.Ge & C.M.Chen 2008 – Taiwan

== See also ==
- List of Agaricaceae genera
- List of Agaricales genera
