= Barcheria =

Scientific classification
- Kingdom: Fungi
- Division: Basidiomycota
- Class: Agaricomycetes
- Order: Agaricales
- Family: Agaricaceae
- Genus: Barcheria; T.Lebel (2008)

Type species
- Barcheria willisiana T.Lebel (2008)

Genus of fungi

Barcheria is a fungal genus in the family Agaricaceae. This is a monotypic genus, containing the single sequestrate (having underground fruiting bodies) species Barcheria willisiana, found in western Australia.

== Taxonomy ==
The type material was collected from mallee woodlands near Norseman, Western Australia. The genus name Barcheria honours Barbara Archer, "an enthusiastic and versatile collector who has contributed much to the knowledge of the arid-land fungi of Western Australia". The specific epithet willisiana acknowledges the Jim Willis family of Victoria.

== Description ==
Fruit bodies of Barcheria are small, measuring 15–65 mm (0.6–2.6 in) by 13–55 mm (0.5–2.2 in). They have a fragile texture, lack a stipe, and have purplish-brown scales on the outer skin (peridium). The internal gleba changes colour from cream to pale after it is exposed to air. Spores are thick walled and smooth, roughly spherical to broadly ellipsoid, and hyaline (translucent) when mounted in water or dilute potassium hydroxide. They have dimensions of 10.5–16.5 by 8–12 μm. Basidia (spore-bearing cells) are two-spored and measure 28–39.5 by 5–10 μm; cystidia are rare. The hyphae lack clamp connections.

Other sequestrate fungi in the family Agaricaceae include Montagnea, Gyrophragmium, Longula, and Endoptychum. In contrast with these genera, Barcheria lacks a stipe, the gleba changes colour upon exposure, and its spores are hyaline.

== Habitat and distribution ==
The fungus is known only from the type locality, where it was found fruiting from July to August in red clay loam at a roadside verge. Nearby vegetation included species of Eucalyptus, Allocasuarina, and Melaleuca.

== See also ==
- List of Agaricales genera
- List of Agaricaceae genera
