= Smithiogaster =

Scientific classification
- Kingdom: Fungi
- Division: Basidiomycota
- Class: Agaricomycetes
- Order: Agaricales
- Family: Agaricaceae
- Genus: Smithiogaster; J.E.Wright (1975)

Type species
- Smithiogaster volvoagaricus J.E.Wright (1975)

Genus of fungi

Smithiogaster is a fungal genus in the family Agaricaceae. It is a monotypic genus, containing the single gasteroid species Smithiogaster volvoagaricus. Smithiogaster was circumscribed by J.E.Wright in 1975.

The genus name of Smithiogaster is in honour of Alexander Hanchett Smith (1904–1986), who was an American mycologist known for his extensive contributions to the taxonomy and phylogeny of the higher fungi, especially the agarics.

== See also ==
- List of Agaricaceae genera
- List of Agaricales genera
