= Smithiomyces =

Scientific classification
- Domain: Eukaryota
- Kingdom: Fungi
- Division: Basidiomycota
- Class: Agaricomycetes
- Order: Agaricales
- Family: Agaricaceae
- Genus: Smithiomyces; Singer (1944)

Type species
- Smithiomyces mexicanus (Murrill) Singer (1944)

Species
- S. asiaticus S. dominicanus S. heterosporus S. lanosofarinosus S. lepiotoides S. mexicanus

Genus of fungi

Smithiomyces is a genus of fungi in the family Agaricaceae. It was circumscribed by Rolf Singer in 1944. The type species, S. mexicanus, was formerly placed in Amanita, as well as the now obsolete genera Leucomyces and Venenarius. The genus was named to honor American mycologist Alexander H. Smith.

== Species ==
- Smithiomyces asiaticus Z.W.Ge & H.Qu (2021)
- Smithiomyces dominicanus Justo, Angelini & Bizzi (2015)
- Smithiomyces heterosporus Z.W.Ge & H.Qu (2021)
- Smithiomyces lanosofarinosus (Rick) Raithelh. (1988)
- Smithiomyces lepiotoides Z.W.Ge & H.Qu (2021)
- Smithiomyces mexicanus (Murrill) Singer (1944)

== See also ==
- List of Agaricales genera
- List of Agaricaceae genera
