= Pseudoauricularia =

Scientific classification
- Kingdom: Fungi
- Division: Basidiomycota
- Class: Agaricomycetes
- Order: Agaricales
- Family: Agaricaceae
- Genus: Pseudoauricularia; Kobayasi (1982)

Type species
- Pseudoauricularia papuana Kobayasi (1982)

Genus of fungi

Pseudoauricularia is a genus of fungi in the family Agaricaceae. This is a monotypic genus, containing the single species Pseudoauricularia papuana, described as new to science in 1982 by Japanese mycologist Yosio Kobayasi.

== See also ==
- List of Agaricaceae genera
- List of Agaricales genera
