= S. indica =

S. indica may refer to:

- Salvia indica, a herbaceous perennial plant species
- Saraca indica, the Ashoka tree, a plant species
- Sillago indica, the Indian whiting, a coastal marine fish species
- Singerina indica, the single species in the monotypic genus Singerina

== Synonyms ==
- Sida indica, a synonym for Abutilon indicum, an invasive plant species
- Spathodea indica, a synonym for Oroxylum indicum, a tree species
- Sphaerotheca indica, a synonym for Podosphaera xanthii

== See also ==
- Indica (disambiguation)
