= Xanthagaricus caeruleus =

Scientific classification
- Kingdom: Fungi
- Division: Basidiomycota
- Class: Agaricomycetes
- Order: Agaricales
- Family: Agaricaceae
- Genus: Xanthagaricus
- Species: X. caeruleus

Binomial name
- Xanthagaricus caeruleus Iqbal Hosen, T.H. Li & Z.P. Song (2018)

Species of fungus

Xanthagaricus caeruleus is a species of the fungal family Agaricaceae. This species is described from China.
