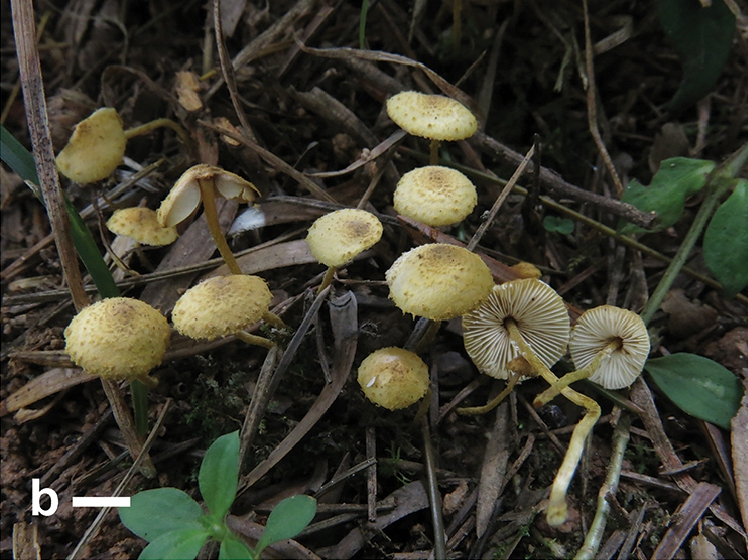
- Xanthagaricus flavosquamosus

Scientific classification
- Domain: Eukaryota
- Kingdom: Fungi
- Division: Basidiomycota
- Class: Agaricomycetes
- Order: Agaricales
- Family: Agaricaceae
- Genus: Xanthagaricus (Heinem.) Little Flower, Hosag. & T.K.Abraham (1997)

Species
- 23, see text

Synonyms
- Hymenagaricus subgen. Xanthagaricus Heinem. (1984)

= Xanthagaricus =

Genus of fungi

Xanthagaricus is a genus of fungi in the family Agaricaceae. The genus contains 23 species found in India, Sri Lanka, Bangladesh, Thailand, China and Africa. Originally described in 1984 by Belgian mycologist Paul Heinemann as Hymenagaricus subgen. Xanthagaricus, it was promoted to generic status in 1997.

== Species ==
- Xanthagaricus brunneolus
- Xanthagaricus caeruleus
- Xanthagaricus calicutensis
- Xanthagaricus chrysosporus
- Xanthagaricus epipastus
- Xanthagaricus erinaceus
- Xanthagaricus flavidorufus
- Xanthagaricus flavosquamosus
- Xanthagaricus globisporus
- Xanthagaricus gracilis
- Xanthagaricus luteolosporus
- Xanthagaricus myriostictus
- Xanthagaricus nanus
- Xanthagaricus necopinatus
- Xanthagaricus ochraceoluteus
- Xanthagaricus pakistanicus
- Xanthagaricus rubescens
- Xanthagaricus rufomarginatus
- Xanthagaricus subaeruginosus
- Xanthagaricus subepipastus
- Xanthagaricus taiwanensis
- Xanthagaricus thailandensis
- Xanthagaricus viridulus
