= Metraria =

Scientific classification
- Kingdom: Fungi
- Division: Basidiomycota
- Class: Agaricomycetes
- Order: Agaricales
- Family: Agaricaceae
- Genus: Metraria (Cooke) Cooke & Massee (1891)

Type species
- Metraria insignis Cooke & Massee ex Sacc. (1891)

Species
- M. brevipes M. insignis

Synonyms
- Agaricus subgen. Metraria Cooke (1891)

Genus of fungi

Metraria is a genus of two species of fungi in the family Agaricaceae.

== See also ==
- List of Agaricaceae genera
- List of Agaricales genera
