= Phyllogaster =

Scientific classification
- Kingdom: Fungi
- Division: Basidiomycota
- Class: Agaricomycetes
- Order: Agaricales
- Family: Agaricaceae
- Genus: Phyllogaster; Pegler (1969)

Type species
- Phyllogaster pholiotoides Pegler (1969)

Genus of fungi

Phyllogaster is a fungal genus in the family Agaricaceae. This is a monotypic genus, containing the single species Phyllogaster pholiotoides, found in Ghana and described as new to science in 1969.

== See also ==
- List of Agaricaceae genera
- List of Agaricales genera
