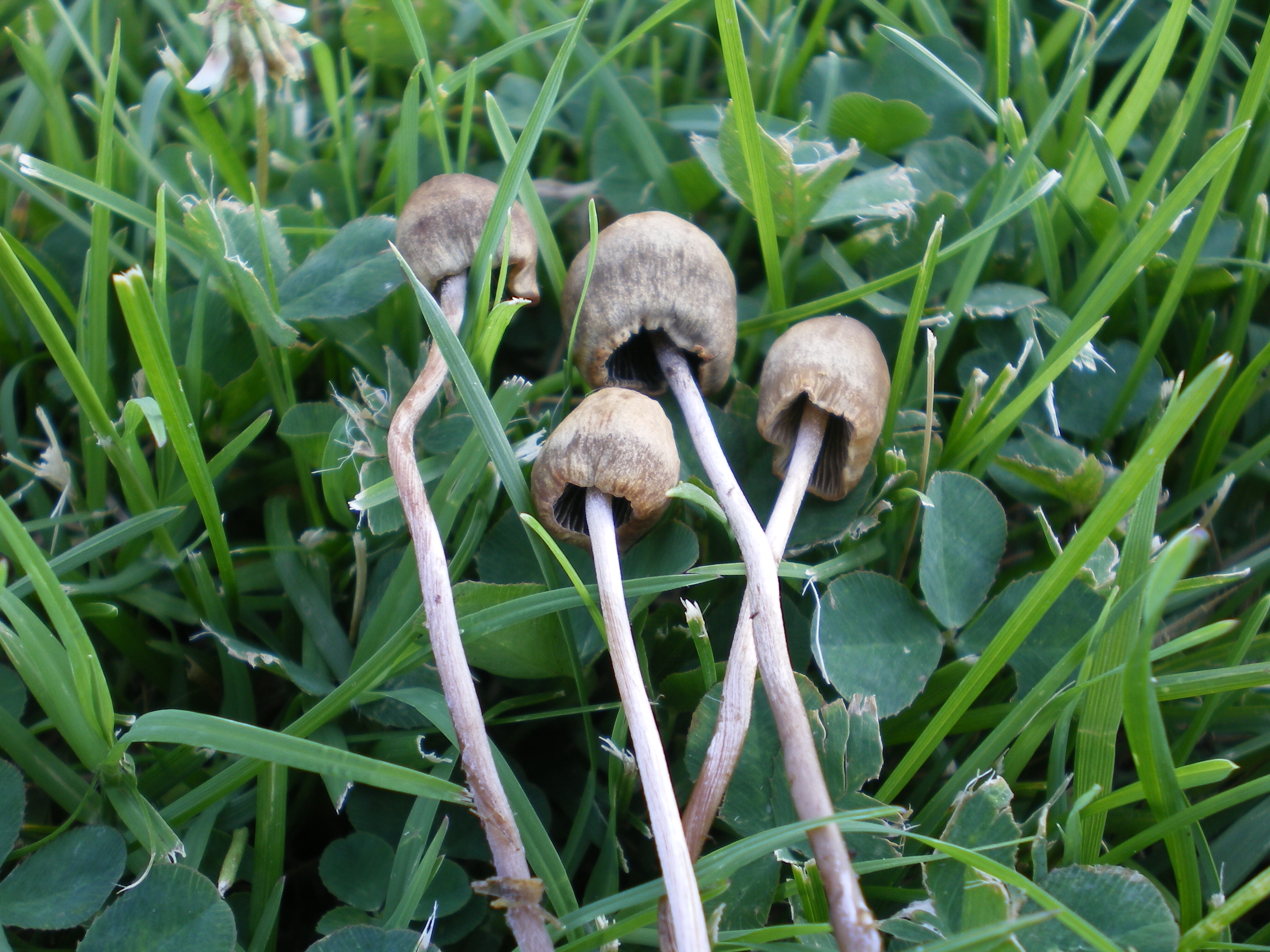
- Panaeolopsis spp.

Scientific classification
- Kingdom: Fungi
- Division: Basidiomycota
- Class: Agaricomycetes
- Order: Agaricales
- Family: Agaricaceae
- Genus: Panaeolopsis; Singer (1969)

Type species
- Panaeolopsis sanmartiniana Singer (1969)

Species
- P. brasiliensis P. nirimbii P. obtusa P. sanmartiniana

= Panaeolopsis =

Genus of fungi

Panaeolopsis is a genus of fungi in the family Agaricaceae. The genus has a widespread distribution and contains four species. Panaeolopsis was circumscribed by Rolf Singer in 1969 with P. sanmartiniana as the type species.
