= Metrodia =

Scientific classification
- Kingdom: Fungi
- Division: Basidiomycota
- Class: Agaricomycetes
- Order: Agaricales
- Family: Agaricaceae
- Genus: Metrodia; Raithelh. (1971)

Type species
- Metrodia collybioides Raithelh. (1971)

Species
- Metrodia collybioides Metrodia excissa

Genus of fungi

Metrodia is a genus of fungi in the family Agaricaceae. It was circumscribed in 1971 by mycologist Jörg H. Raithelhuber, with M. collybioides as the type species. M. excissa was added to the genus in 1983.

The genus name of Metrodia is in honour of Georges Métrod (also known Léon Georges Edmond Métrod) (1883 - 1961), who was a French mathematician, botanist (Mycology) and watercolor painter.

The genus was circumscribed in Metrodiana vol.2 (4): xxvii in 1971.

== See also ==
- List of Agaricaceae genera
- List of Agaricales genera
