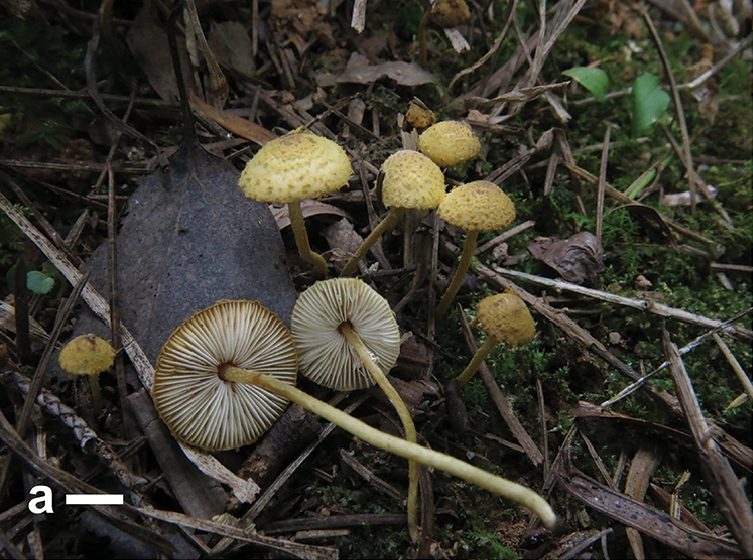

Scientific classification
- Kingdom: Fungi
- Division: Basidiomycota
- Class: Agaricomycetes
- Order: Agaricales
- Family: Agaricaceae
- Genus: Xanthagaricus
- Species: X. flavosquamosus

Binomial name
- Xanthagaricus flavosquamosus T.H. Li, Iqbal Hosen & Z.P. Song (2017)

= Xanthagaricus flavosquamosus =

Species of fungus

Xanthagaricus flavosquamosus is a species of the fungal family Agaricaceae.This species is described from China.
