= Amanita groenlandica =

Scientific classification
- Kingdom: Fungi
- Division: Basidiomycota
- Class: Agaricomycetes
- Order: Agaricales
- Family: Amanitaceae
- Genus: Amanita
- Species: A. groenlandica

Binomial name
- Amanita groenlandica Bas ex Knudsen & T.Borgen

Synonyms
- Amanita groenlandica f. alpina C.Cripps & K.E.Horak

Species of fungus

- Mycological characteristics
- Gills on hymenium
- Cap is convex or umbonate
- Hymenium is free
- Stipe has a volva
- Spore print is white
- Ecology is mycorrhizal
- Edibility is unknown

Amanita groenlandica is a species of fungus in the family Amanitaceae. It has been placed in Amanita sect. Vaginatae.

== Taxonomy ==
Amanita groenlandica was classified by the mycologists Henning Knudsen and Torbjørn Borgen in 1987 after a previous classification by Dutch mycologist Cornelis Bas in 1977 failed to satisfy the rules for a valid publication.

Amanita groenlandica f. alpina is the alpine form of this species found in the Rocky Mountains of North America classified by the mycologists C.L. Cripps and Karl E. Horak in 2010. It is considered a synonym of A. groenlandica.

== Description ==
A. groenlandica is a large Amanita mushroom with white flesh.

Cap: 3–12 centimetres (1–4 1/2 inches) at the extreme but more commonly in the range of 5–9 cm. Initially hemispheric expanding to convex with a broad umbo which declines or disappears as the cap flattens with age. Pale straw or greyish yellow in colour when young with a bright yellow to brown colour developing as it ages. Patches of the universal veil or volva often remain like scales on the cap. Stem: 4–15 cm in height with a thickness of 0.8–2 cm tapering to up to 3.3 cm at the base. White to pale brown or grey in colour. Ringless with a fragile grey or ochre volva. Gills: Free. Initially white with a pale cream colour developing with age. Spore print: White. Spores: Globose or subglobose, hyaline and nonamyloid. 9.6–12.8 μm diameter. Taste: Indistinct. Smell: Indistinct.

Amanita groenlandica f. alpina is described as being similar to A. groenlandica only taller and with a different colouration that tends to more pale orange-brown colours in the cap, which is also described as being less viscid. The universal veil is described as sometimes being more creamy in colour rather than possessing the grey tones of A. groenlandica. Unlike A. groenlandica which is described as odorless f. alpina is said to have a fruity smell when young which becomes unpleasant with age.

== Distribution and habitat ==
A. groenlandica is an arctic species described from Greenland where it is the most common species of Amanita. It is found growing in small groups or as a solitary mushroom under willow and birch trees. Found from July to September but most commonly in August.

In 2022 the fungus was documented in the Cairngorms mountains of Scotland based on DNA analysis performed on soil samples.

Amanita groenlandica f. alpina has been documented from the Rocky Mountains of North America where it was observed growing with willow trees. It fruits July through August on the Beartooth and Hellroaring Plateaus at an elevation of 3,100-3,400 metres above sea level.
