= Xerocoprinus =

Scientific classification
- Kingdom: Fungi
- Division: Basidiomycota
- Class: Agaricomycetes
- Order: Agaricales
- Family: Agaricaceae
- Genus: Xerocoprinus; Maire (1907)

Type species
- Xerocoprinus arenarius (Pat.) Maire (1907)

Synonyms
- Coprinus arenarius Pat. (1896)

Genus of fungi

Xerocoprinus is a fungal genus in the family Agaricaceae. This is a monotypic genus, containing the single species Xerocoprinus arenarius, originally named Coprinus arenarius by Narcisse Théophile Patouillard in 1896. Xerocoprinus was circumscribed by French mycologist René Maire in 1907.

== See also ==
- List of Agaricales genera
- List of Agaricaceae genera
