= Schizostoma =

Scientific classification
- Domain: Eukaryota
- Kingdom: Fungi
- Division: Basidiomycota
- Class: Agaricomycetes
- Order: Agaricales
- Family: Agaricaceae
- Genus: Schizostoma (Ehrenb. ex Lév. 1846

Genus of fungus

Schizostoma is a genus of fungus in the family Agaricaceae. It was first described in 1846 by Christian Gottfried Ehrenberg The type species is Schizostoma laceratum (Ehrenb. ex Fr.) Lév. 1846

== Species ==
Following Mycobank, associated species are:

Schizostoma applanata, Schizostoma applanatum, Schizostoma argentinense, Schizostoma bailingmiaoense, Schizostoma berteroanum, Schizostoma byssisedium, Schizostoma byssisedum, Schizostoma cercocarpi, Schizostoma coffeanum, Schizostoma dengkouense, Schizostoma exasperatum, Schizostoma fimbriatum, Schizostoma hysterioides, Schizostoma incongruum, Schizostoma jaczevskii, Schizostoma laceratum, Schizostoma leveilleanum, Schizostoma melanospermum, Schizostoma microsporum, Schizostoma montagnei, Schizostoma mundkurii, Schizostoma muroianum, Schizostoma nevadensis, Schizostoma ovinum, Schizostoma pachythele, Schizostoma pusillum, Schizostoma rigense, Schizostoma schomburgkii, Schizostoma stupeum, Schizostoma tuyutense, Schizostoma ulanbuhense, Schizostoma vicinissimum, Schizostoma vicinum

(Not all of these may be accepted)
