= Crucispora =

Scientific classification
- Kingdom: Fungi
- Division: Basidiomycota
- Class: Agaricomycetes
- Order: Agaricales
- Family: Agaricaceae
- Genus: Crucispora; E.Horak (1971)

Type species
- Crucispora naucorioides E.Horak (1971)

Species
- C. naucorioides C. rhombisperma

Genus of fungi

Crucispora is a genus of fungi in the family Agaricaceae. The genus, described by mycologist Egon Horak in 1971, contains two species found in New Zealand and Asia.

== See also ==
- List of Agaricales genera
- List of Agaricaceae genera
