= Chlorolepiota =

Scientific classification
- Kingdom: Fungi
- Division: Basidiomycota
- Class: Agaricomycetes
- Order: Agaricales
- Family: Agaricaceae
- Genus: Chlorolepiota; Sathe & S.D.Deshp. (1979)

Type species
- Chlorolepiota mahabaleshwarensis Sathe & S.D.Deshp. (1979)

Species
- C. brunneotincta C. indica C. mahabaleshwarensis

Genus of fungi

Chlorolepiota is a genus of fungi in the family Agaricaceae. It is characterized by mushrooms with a macrolepiotoid habit, a pruinose yellow-greenish spore print, and the lack of clamp connections in the hyphae. The genus was circumscribed in 1979, with C. mahabaleshwarensis as the type and only species. C. indica was described in 2013, and C. brunneotincta in 2014. All species are found in India. The generic name Chlorolepiota is a portmanteau of Chlorophyllum and Macrolepiota, two closely related genera.

== Species ==
Based on current taxonomy, the genus comprises three species :

- Chlorolepiota brunneotincta Atri, B. Kumari & R.C. Upadhyay 2014
- Chlorolepiota indica Atri & B. Kumari 2013,
- Chlorolepiota mahabaleshwarensis Sathe & S.D. Deshp. 1979

== See also ==
- List of Agaricales genera
- List of Agaricaceae genera
