= Schizostoma laceratum =

Scientific classification
- Domain: Eukaryota
- Kingdom: Fungi
- Division: Basidiomycota
- Class: Agaricomycetes
- Order: Agaricales
- Family: Agaricaceae
- Genus: Schizostoma
- Species: S. laceratum

Binomial name
- Schizostoma laceratum (Ehrenb. ex Fr.) Lév. 1846

Species of fungus

Schizostoma laceratum is a fungus in the family Agaricaceae. It was first described in 1829 by Christian Gottfried Ehrenberg as Tulostoma laceratum, and transferred to the genus, Schizostoma, in 1846 by Joseph-Henri Léveillé.
