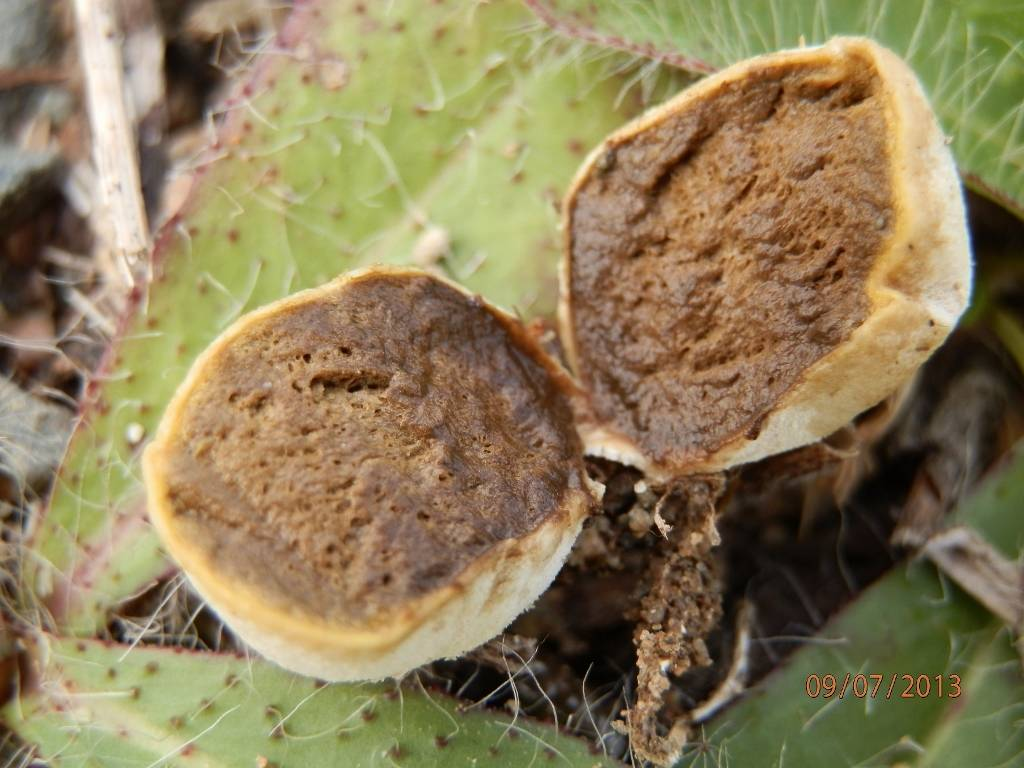
- Arachnion album

Scientific classification
- Kingdom: Fungi
- Division: Basidiomycota
- Class: Agaricomycetes
- Order: Agaricales
- Family: Agaricaceae
- Genus: Arachnion; Schwein. (1822)

Type species
- Arachnion album Schwein. (1822)

Synonyms
- Scoleciocarpus Berk. (1843)

= Arachnion =

Genus of fungi

Arachnion is a genus of gasteroid fungi in the family Agaricaceae.

== Taxonomy ==
The genus was circumscribed by Lewis David von Schweinitz in 1822 with Arachnion album as the type, and only species. The genus name is Greek for "cobweb".

William Chambers Coker and John Nathaniel Couch circumscribed the family Arachniaceae in 1928 to contain Arachnion. The genus was later placed in the now-defunct family Lycoperdaceae. Modern molecular analysis has shown that Arachnion, as well as other puffball genera, are part of the family Agaricaceae.

== Description ==
Arachnion species have a characteristic gleba, resembling a mass of grainy, sand-like particles. At a microscopic scale, the granules are peridioles, or tiny sacs made of hyphae that contain spores. Inside each sac is a minuscule chamber that contains inward-facing basidia (spore-bearing cells), an arrangement similar to that seen in Lycoperdon. The fruitbodies have a smooth, thin, and fragile peridium that readily disintegrates into small pieces in maturity to expose the granular contents.

== Distribution ==
The genus is widely distributed, with species found in Australia, North and South America, South Africa, and Europe, and Japan.

== Species ==
As of January 2016, Index Fungorum accepts 11 species in Arachnion:

- Arachnion alborosellum Verwoerd 1926 – South Africa
- Arachnion album Schwein. 1822
- Arachnion bovista (Mont.) Mont. 1849
- Arachnion firmoderma Verwoerd 1926 – South Africa
- Arachnion foetens Speg. 1906 – South America
- Arachnion iriemae Rick 1961
- Arachnion iulii Quadr. 1996 – Italy
- Arachnion lazoi Demoulin 1972
- Arachnion lloydianum Demoulin 1972
- Arachnion rufum Lloyd 1906
- Arachnion scleroderma Lloyd 1915
