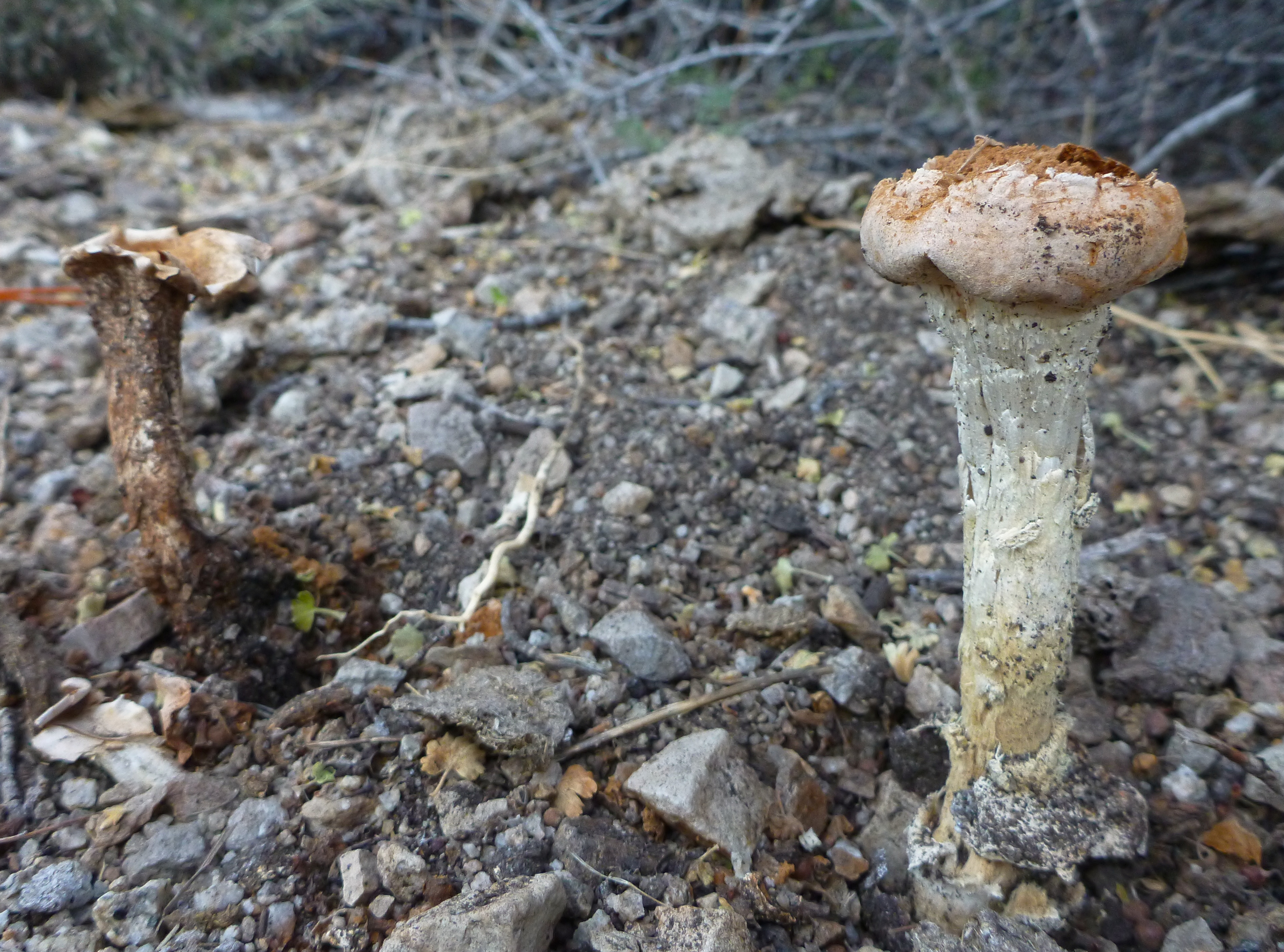
- Chlamydopus meyenianus

Scientific classification
- Kingdom: Fungi
- Division: Basidiomycota
- Class: Agaricomycetes
- Order: Agaricales
- Family: Agaricaceae
- Genus: Chlamydopus; Speg. (1898)

Type species
- Chlamydopus clavatus Speg. (1898)

Species
- C. clavatus C. meyenianus

= Chlamydopus =

Genus of fungi

Chlamydopus is a genus of fungi in the family Agaricaceae. It was circumscribed by Carlos Luigi Spegazzini in 1898.
