= Eriocybe =

Scientific classification
- Kingdom: Fungi
- Division: Basidiomycota
- Class: Agaricomycetes
- Order: Agaricales
- Family: Agaricaceae
- Genus: Eriocybe; Vellinga (2011)

Type species
- Eriocybe chionea Vellinga (2011)

Genus of fungi

Eriocybe is a fungal genus in the family Agaricaceae. Circumscribed by mycologist Else Vellinga in 2011, it is a monotypic genus, containing the single species Eriocybe chionea, found in northern Thailand. The genus name is derived from the Ancient Greek words ἔριον, meaning "wool" and κύβη, "head". The specific epithet comes from the Latin translation of the Greek χιόνεος, meaning "snow white".

== See also ==
- List of Agaricaceae genera
- List of Agaricales genera
