= Acutocapillitium =

Scientific classification
- Kingdom: Fungi
- Division: Basidiomycota
- Class: Agaricomycetes
- Order: Agaricales
- Family: Agaricaceae
- Genus: Acutocapillitium; P. Ponce de León

Type species
- Acutocapillitium torrendii (Lloyd) P. Ponce de León

Species
- A. filiforme A. portoricense A. torrendii

Genus of fungi

Acutocapillitium is a genus of fungi that is tentatively placed in the family Agaricaceae; its phylogenetic relationships to other genera in the family are not well known. The genus contains three species found in tropical America.
