= Patricio Ponce de León =

Patricio Ponce de León (August 26, 1915 – February 26, 2010) was a Cuban mycologist. He was a professor at Belen School in Havana and at the University of Havana, and later a curator at the Field Museum of Natural History in Chicago, Illinois. He wrote a monograph on the worldwide species of the family Geastraceae, the earthstar fungi. Ponce de León died in Miami, Florida.

== Taxa described ==
- Acutocapillitium 1976
- Acutocapillitium portoricense 1976
- Bovista cacao 1975
- Geastrum furfuraceum 1968
- Geastrum victorinii 1946
- Morganella stercoraria 1971

== Selected publications ==
- Ponce de León P. (1968). "A revision of the Family Geastraceae". Fieldiana: Botany 31 (14): 303–352.
- Ponce de León P. (1969). "A new member of Morganella". Fieldiana: Botany 32 (6): 69–71.
- Ponce de León P. (1970). "Revision of the genus Vascellum (Lycoperdaceae)". Fieldiana: Botany 32 (9):109–126.
- Ponce de León P. (1971). "Revision of the genus Morganella (Lycoperdaceae)." Fieldiana: Botany 34 (3):27–44.
- Ponce de León P. (1975). "Notes on Calvatia (Lycoperdaceae), I". Fieldiana: Botany 38 (1):1–3.
- Ponce de León P. (1976). "Acutocapillitium, a new genus in the Lycoperdaceae". Fieldiana: Botany 38 (4):23–29.
- Ponce de León P. (1976). "Notes on Calvatia (Lycoperdaceae), II : Calvatia cretacea (Berk.) Lloyd, an Arctic montane plant". Fieldiana: Botany 38 (3):15–22.
- Singer R, Ponce de León P. (1983). "Sister Mary Cecilia Bodman, 1905–1982". Mycologia 75 (5):932–933. JSTOR 3792792
- Smith CW, Ponce de León P. (1982). "Hawaiian geastroid fungi". Mycologia 74 (5):712–717. JSTOR 3792856
- Singer R, Ponce de León P, Machol RE. (1984). "(42-44) Three Proposals to Amend the Code". Taxon 33 (4):745–47. JSTOR 1220807
