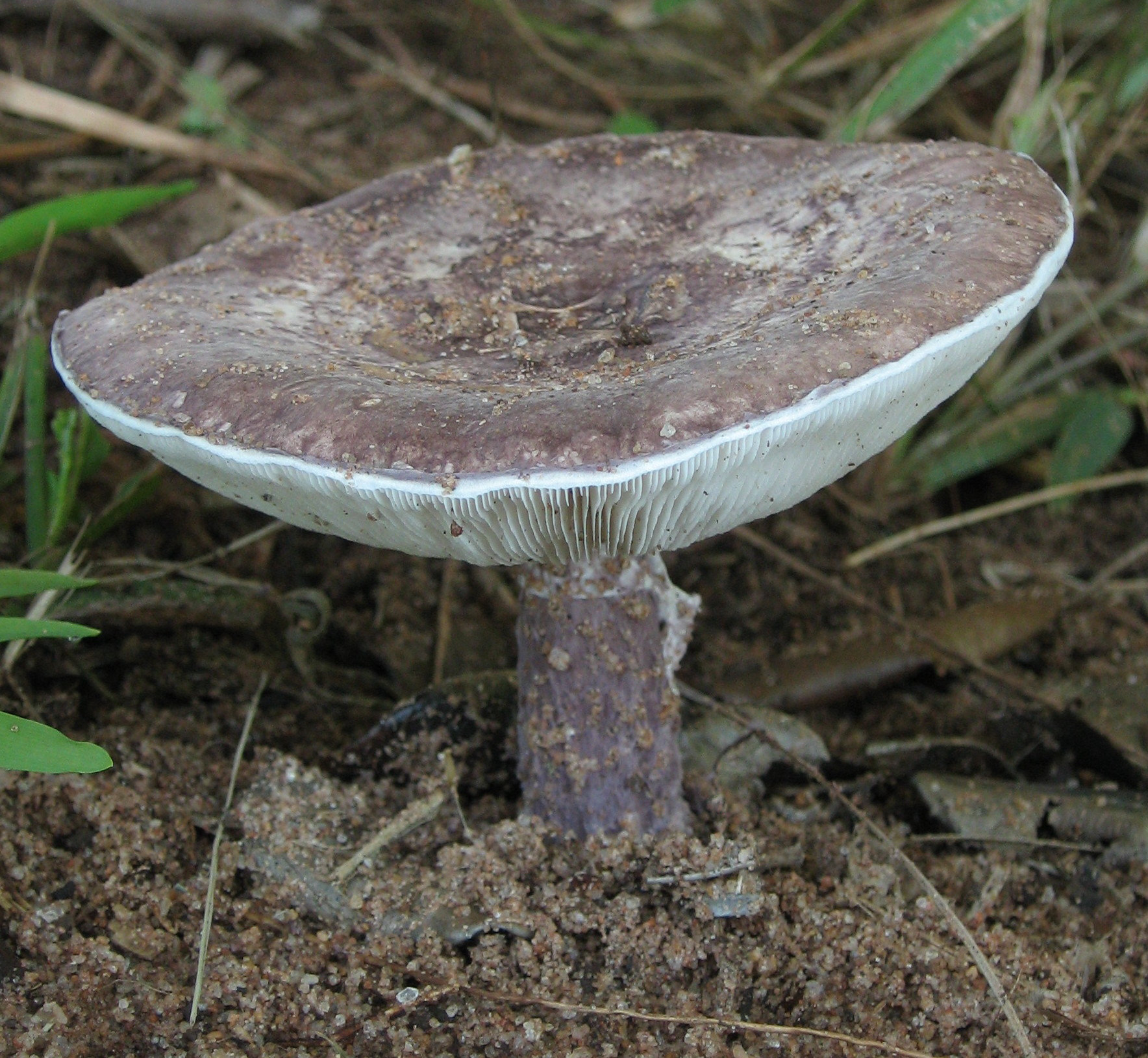
- Coniolepiota spongodes

Scientific classification
- Kingdom: Fungi
- Division: Basidiomycota
- Class: Agaricomycetes
- Order: Agaricales
- Family: Agaricaceae
- Genus: Coniolepiota; Vellinga (2011)

Type species
- Coniolepiota spongodes (Berk. & Broome) Vellinga (2011)

Synonyms
- Lepiota spongodes (Berk. & Broome) Sacc. (1887); Lepiota spongodes (Berk. & Broome) Sacc. (1887)

= Coniolepiota =

Genus of fungi

Coniolepiota is a fungal genus in the family Agaricaceae. The genus is monotypic, containing only a single species, Coniolepiota spongodes. It was first described from Thailand, and later also reported from Bangladesh and China. The species has also been observed in Malaysia, Singapore, Cambodia, Indonesia, Taiwan, Philippines, and South Africa.

== See also ==
- List of Agaricaceae genera
- List of Agaricales genera
