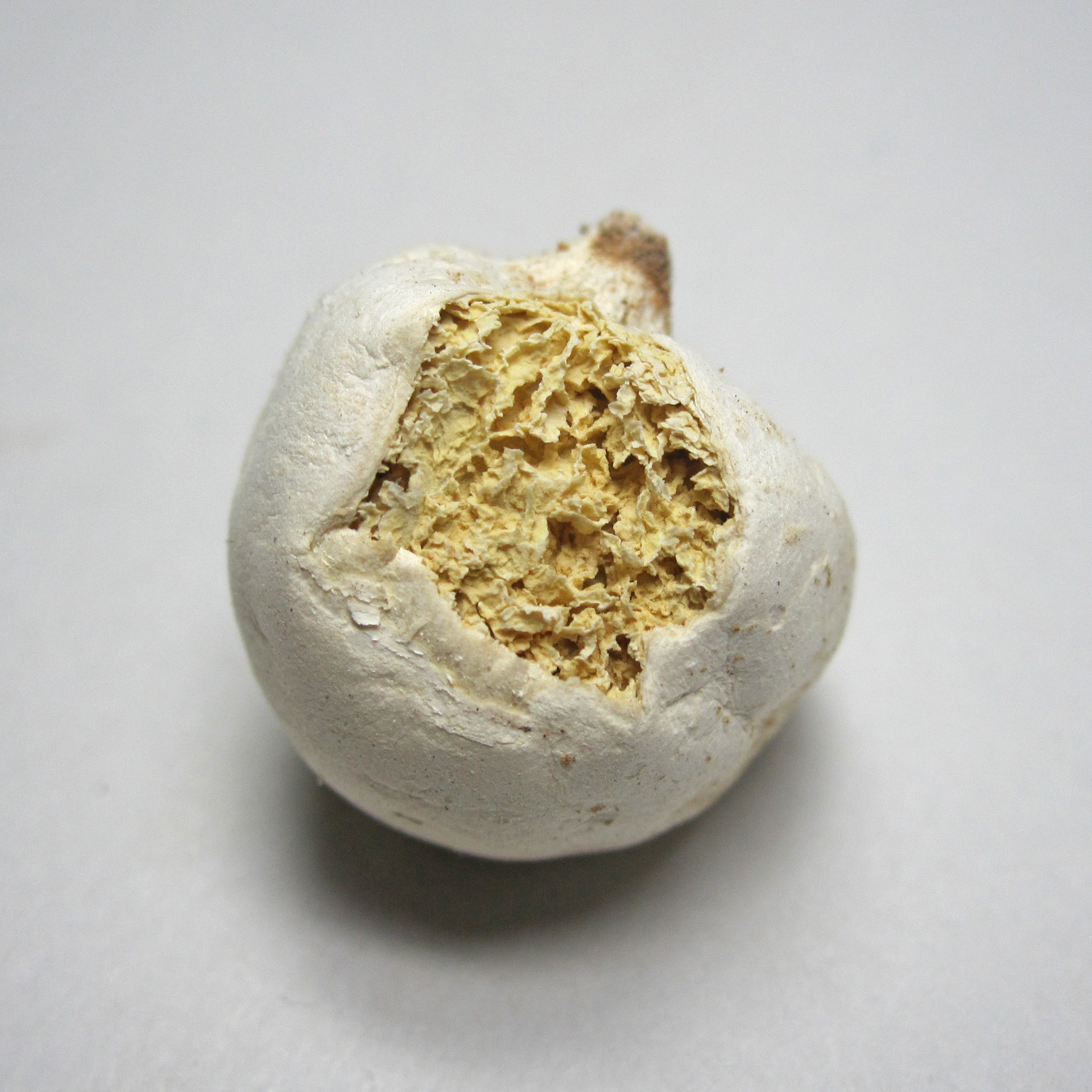
- Holocotylon brandegeeanum

Scientific classification
- Kingdom: Fungi
- Division: Basidiomycota
- Class: Agaricomycetes
- Order: Agaricales
- Family: Agaricaceae
- Genus: Holocotylon; Lloyd (1906)

Type species
- Holocotylon brandegeeanum Lloyd (1906)

Species
- H. anomalum H. brandegeeanum H. texense

= Holocotylon =

Genus of fungi

Holocotylon is a genus of fungi in the family Agaricaceae. It was circumscribed by American mycologist Curtis Gates Lloyd in 1906 with H. brandegeeanum as the type species.
