= Singerina =

Scientific classification
- Kingdom: Fungi
- Division: Basidiomycota
- Class: Agaricomycetes
- Order: Agaricales
- Family: Agaricaceae
- Genus: Singerina; Sathe & S.D.Deshp. (1981)

Type species
- Singerina indica Sathe & S.D.Deshp. (1981)

Genus of fungi

Singerina is a fungal genus in the family Agaricaceae. It is a monotypic genus, containing the single species Singerina indica, found in Maharashtra, southwest India.

The genus name of Singerina is in honour of Rolf Singer (1906–1994), who was a German-born mycologist and one of the most important taxonomists of gilled mushrooms (agarics) in the 20th century.

== See also ==
- List of Agaricaceae genera
- List of Agaricales genera
