= François Fulgis Chevallier =

French botanist (1796–1840)

François Fulgis Chevallier (1796, Paris – 1840) was a French botanist whose areas of interest included fungi, ferns and algae.

In 1821 he received his doctorate with a thesis on indigenous hemlock in regard to considerations as a poison and a drug. Dissertation sur les ciguës indigènes, considérées comme poisons et comme médicaments. Other noted publications by Chevallier include:

- Essai sur les hypoxylons lichénoïdes, comprenant les genres Hysterium, Polymorphum, Opegrapha, Arthonia, Schizoxylum, Verrucaria, Pertusaria..., 1822 - Essay on lichenoid hypoxylons.
- Histoire des Graphidées, accompagnée d'un tableau analytique des genres. Paris, 1824 - History of Graphidaceae, accompanied by an analytic table of genres.
- Flore générale des environs de Paris, selon la méthode naturelle : Description de toutes les plantes agames, cryptogames et phanérogames qui y croissent spontanément, 1836 - General flora found around Paris, according to natural methods: Description of all agamic plants, cryptogams and phanerogams that grow there spontaneously.
- Fungorum et Byssorum illustrationes quos ut plurimum novos, trecentos et ultra cum caeteric minus bene cognitis, in divasis Europae regionibus collegit, ad virum de lineavit, 1837.

The subgenus Chevaliera (genus Aechmea, subfamily Bromelioideae) is named in his honor.

== See also ==
- Category:Taxa named by François Fulgis Chevallier
