= Verrucospora =

Scientific classification
- Kingdom: Fungi
- Division: Basidiomycota
- Class: Agaricomycetes
- Order: Agaricales
- Family: Agaricaceae
- Genus: Verrucospora; E. Horak

Genus of fungi

Verrucospora is a genus of fungi in the family Agaricaceae.
