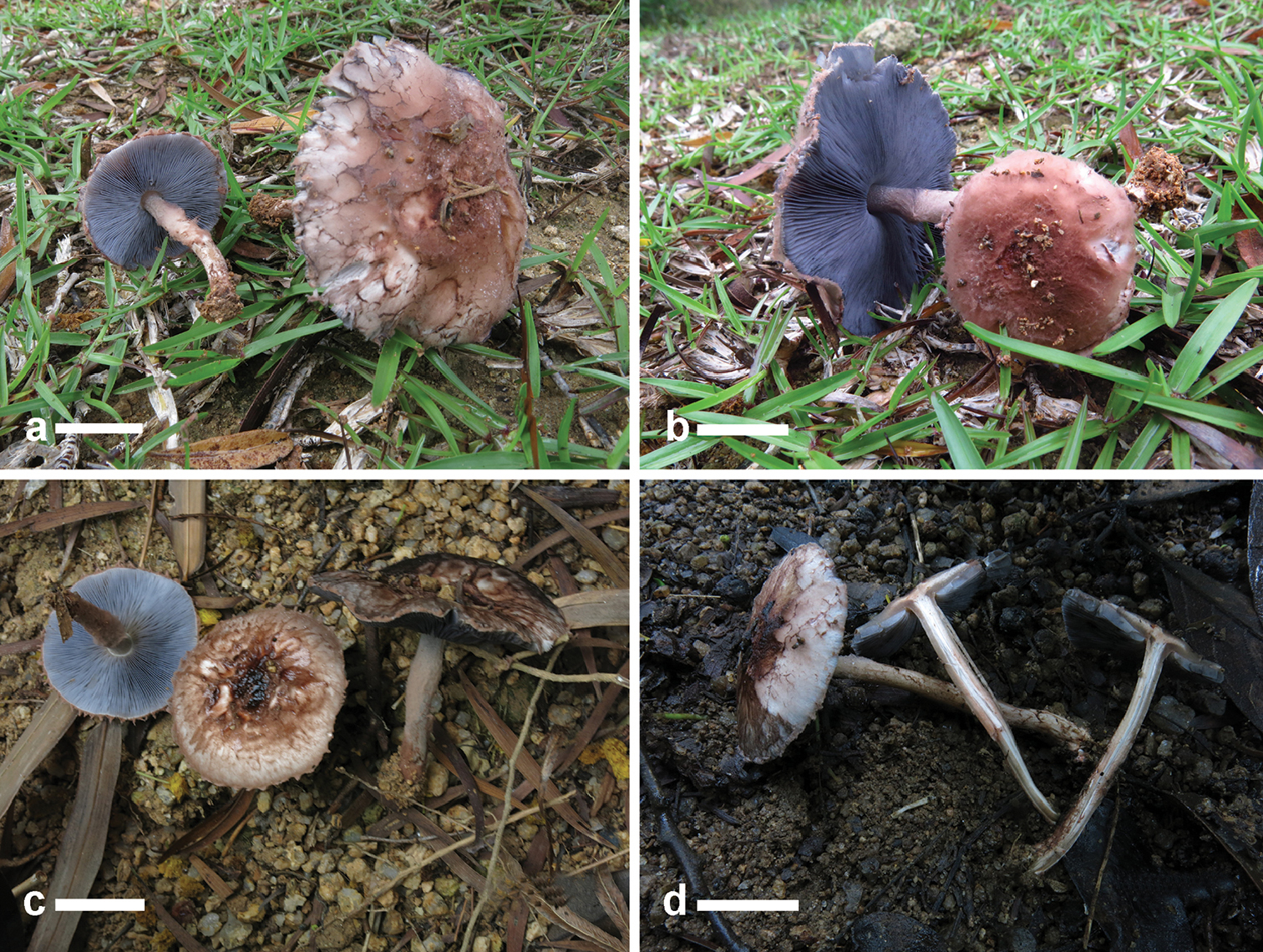
- Heinemannomyces splendidissimus

Scientific classification
- Domain: Eukaryota
- Kingdom: Fungi
- Division: Basidiomycota
- Class: Agaricomycetes
- Order: Agaricales
- Family: Agaricaceae
- Genus: Heinemannomyces; Watling (1999)
- Species: H. splendidissima

Binomial name
- Heinemannomyces splendidissima Watling (1999)

= Heinemannomyces =

Genus of fungi

Heinemannomyces is a fungal genus in the family Agaricaceae. This is a monotypic genus, containing the single species Heinemannomyces splendidissima, which was defined in 1998 by Roy Watling. It is found in peninsular Malaysia and China.

The mushrooms have a woolly veil and blue/grey gills and the flesh reddens when injured.

== See also ==
- List of Agaricaceae genera
- List of Agaricales genera
