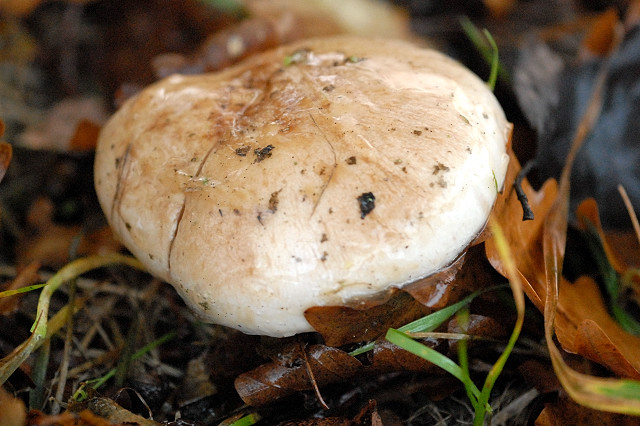
- Chamaemyces fracidus

Scientific classification
- Kingdom: Fungi
- Division: Basidiomycota
- Class: Agaricomycetes
- Order: Agaricales
- Family: Agaricaceae
- Genus: Chamaemyces; Battarra ex Earle (1909)

Type species
- Chamaemyces fracidus (Fr.) Donk (1962)

Species
- C. alphitophyllus C. carmelensis C. fracidus C. medullaris C. paraensis C. pseudocastaneus

Synonyms
- Drosella Maire (1935)

= Chamaemyces =

Genus of fungi

Chamaemyces is a genus of fungi in the family Agaricaceae. It was circumscribed by mycologist Franklin Sumner Earle in 1906.

== Species ==
Based on current taxonomy, the genus comprises six species:

- Chamaemyces alphitophyllus (Berk. & M.A.Curtis) Murrill (1911)
- Chamaemyces carmelensis M.Didukh & Wasser (2004)
- Chamaemyces fracidus (Fr.) Donk (1962)
- Chamaemyces medullaris (Rick) Raithelh. (1988)
- Chamaemyces paraensis Singer (1989)
- Chamaemyces pseudocastaneus (Bon & Boiffard) Contu (1990)
