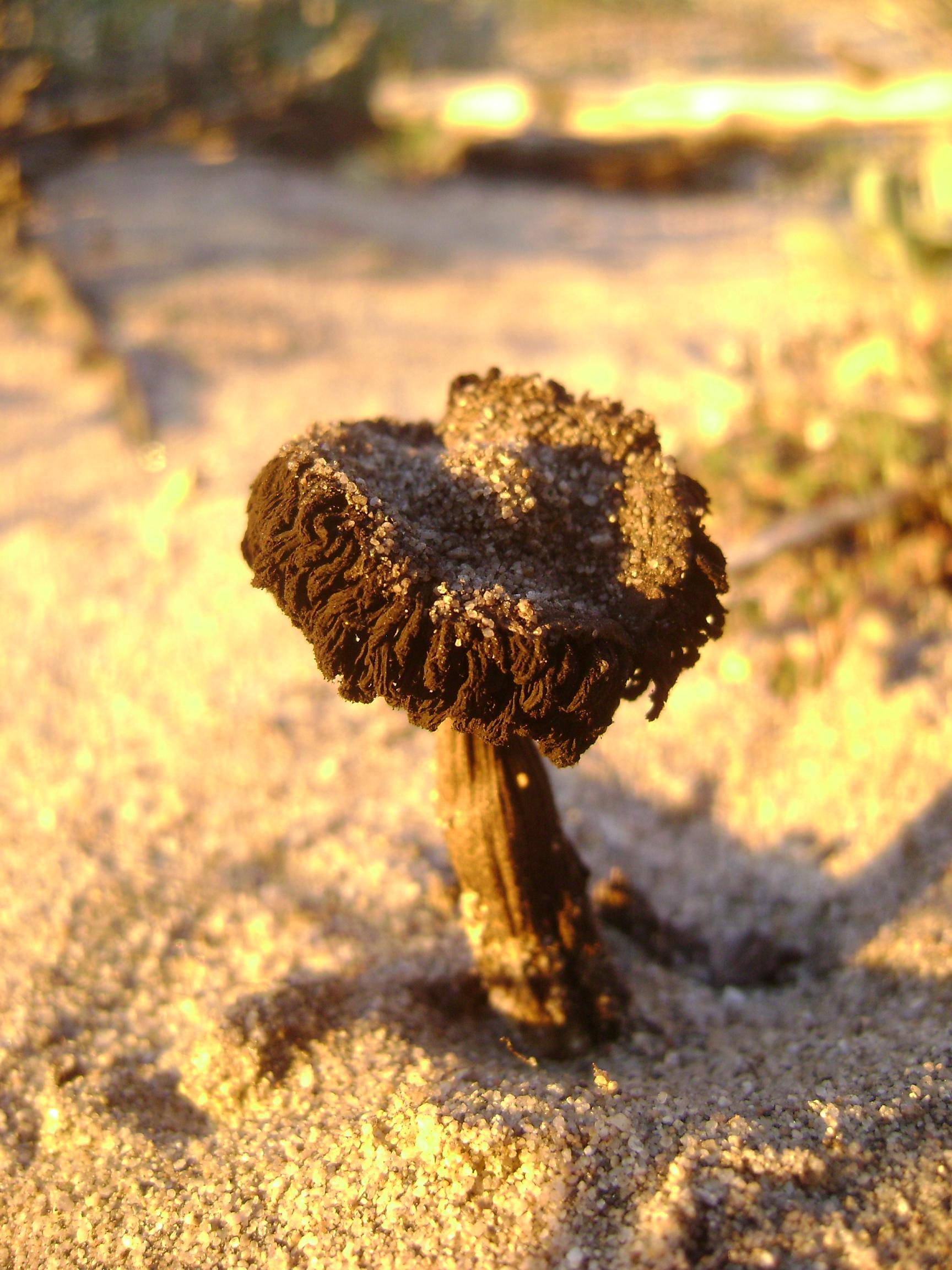
- Gyrophragmium californicum

Scientific classification
- Kingdom: Fungi
- Division: Basidiomycota
- Class: Agaricomycetes
- Order: Agaricales
- Family: Agaricaceae
- Genus: Gyrophragmium; Mont. (1843)

Type species
- Gyrophragmium delilei Mont. (1843)

Species
- Gyrophragmium argentinum Gyrophragmium californicum Gyrophragmium carettei Gyrophragmium delilei Gyrophragmium inquinans Gyrophragmium italicum

Synonyms
- Polyplocium Berk. (1843)

= Gyrophragmium =

Genus of fungi

Gyrophragmium is a genus of fungi in the family Agaricaceae. The genus was circumscribed by French botanist Camille Montagne in 1843.

The species known as G. dunalii was determined to properly belong into genus Agaricus, and since Agaricus dunalii was a preoccupied name it is now known as Agaricus aridicola.
