= Cornelis Bas =

Dutch mycologist (1928–2013)

Dr. Cornelis (Kees) Bas (1928 – February 10, 2013) was a Dutch mycologist.

Dr. Bas was born in Rotterdam and graduated in Biology at Leiden University in 1954. In 1953, he began working at the National Herbarium of the Netherlands, as curator for the fungi, in particular, the Agaricales. Early in his career he played an important role in modernizing the collections of Dutch and European higher fungi. He died on February 10, 2013.
