= Paul Heinemann =

Belgian botanist and mycologist

Paul Heinemann (February 16, 1916 – June 18, 1996) was a Belgian botanist and mycologist. Heinemann specialized in African mycology. In his long career, he published 435 names, including 2 families, 6 genera, 346 species, and 40 varieties. His collections of dried specimens, numbering about 7000, are preserved in the herbaria of the University Faculty of Agricultural Sciences in Gembloux and of the National Botanic Garden of Belgium, in Meise. The fungal genus Heinemannomyces was named in his honor, as were the species Agaricus heinemannianus, Marasmius heinemannianus, and Peyritschiella heinemanniana.
