= Rolf Singer =

German mycologist (1906–1994)

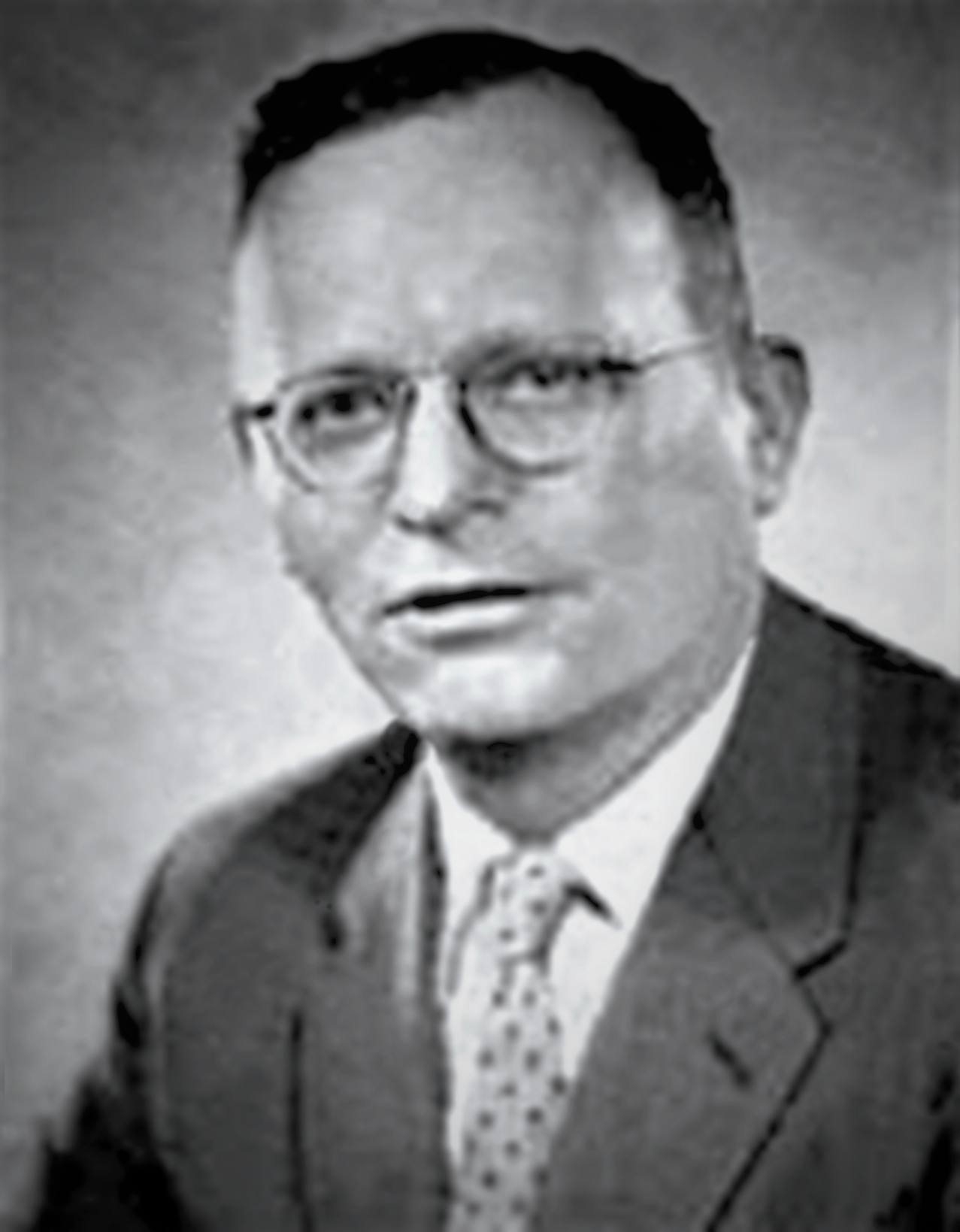
- Rolf Singer in 1945.
- Born: June 23, 1906; Schliersee, German Empire
- Died: January 18, 1994 (aged 87); Chicago, Illinois
- Education: University of Vienna (PhD, 1931)
- Known for: Taxonomy of gilled mushrooms
- Scientific career
- Fields: Mycology
- Thesis: (1931)
- Author abbrev. (botany): Singer

Rolf Singer (June 23, 1906 – January 18, 1994) was a German mycologist and taxonomist of gilled mushrooms (agarics).

He wrote the book "The Agaricales in Modern Taxonomy". He fled to various countries during the Nazi period, pursuing mycology in the Soviet Union, Argentina, and finally the United States, as mycologist at the Field Museum in Chicago.

== Career ==
After receiving his Ph.D. at the University of Vienna in 1931 he worked in Munich. By 1933, however, Singer left Germany for Vienna due to the political deterioration in Germany. There he met his wife, Martha Singer. From Vienna, Singer and his wife went to Barcelona, Spain, where Singer was appointed assistant professor at the Autonomous University of Barcelona. Persecution by the Spanish authorities on behalf of the German government forced Singer to leave Spain for France in 1934. After a fellowship at the Museum d'Histoire Naturelle in Paris, Singer again moved, this time to Leningrad, where he was senior scientific expert at the Botanical Garden of the Academy of Sciences of the USSR. During his time at the academy, Singer made many expeditions to Siberia, the Altai Mountains, and Karelia. In 1941, Singer emigrated to the United States. He was offered a position at Harvard University's Farlow Herbarium as a research associate, then as Assistant Curator, then as acting Curator following the death of Dr. David Linder. He spent a total of seven years at the Farlow. During this time, Singer also received a Guggenheim Fellowship for studies in Florida, and taught at the Mountain Lake Biological Station of the University of Virginia.

In 1948, Singer left Harvard to become professor at the Universidad Nacional de Tucuman in Argentina. Later, in 1961, Singer became professor at the Universidad de Buenos Aires. During his time in South America, Singer, his wife, and his daughter Heidi collected extensively. Singer's last faculty appointment was at the University of Illinois at Chicago, from 1968 to 1977.

Singer was an author (or co-author) of new fungal species, having formally described 2260 in his career. He was also a prolific writer, with more than 400 publications to his name.

== Honours ==
He has been honoured in the naming of several taxa of fungi. Including; Singeriella Petr. in 1959 (in Vizellaceae family), Singera Bat. & J.L.Bezerra 1960 (Vermiculariopsiellaceae family), Mesosingeria S.Archang. 1963 (Fossil, order Cycadales), Singeromyces M.M.Mosera, 1966 (in the family Boletaceae), Singerina Sathe & S.D.Deshp. 1981 (in the family Agaricaceae), and lastly, Singerocomus T.W.Henkel & M.E.Sm. 2016 (Boletaceae family).

== Other sources ==
- Mueller, Gregory M. (1995). "Rolf Singer, 1906-1994". Mycologia. 87 (1): 144–147. doi:10.1080/00275514.1995.12026514. JSTOR 3760958.
- Singer, Martha (1979). "Glancing Back". Sydowia; Annales Mycologici, Beihefte. 8: 14–25.
- Singer, Rolf. "Curriculum Vitae"
