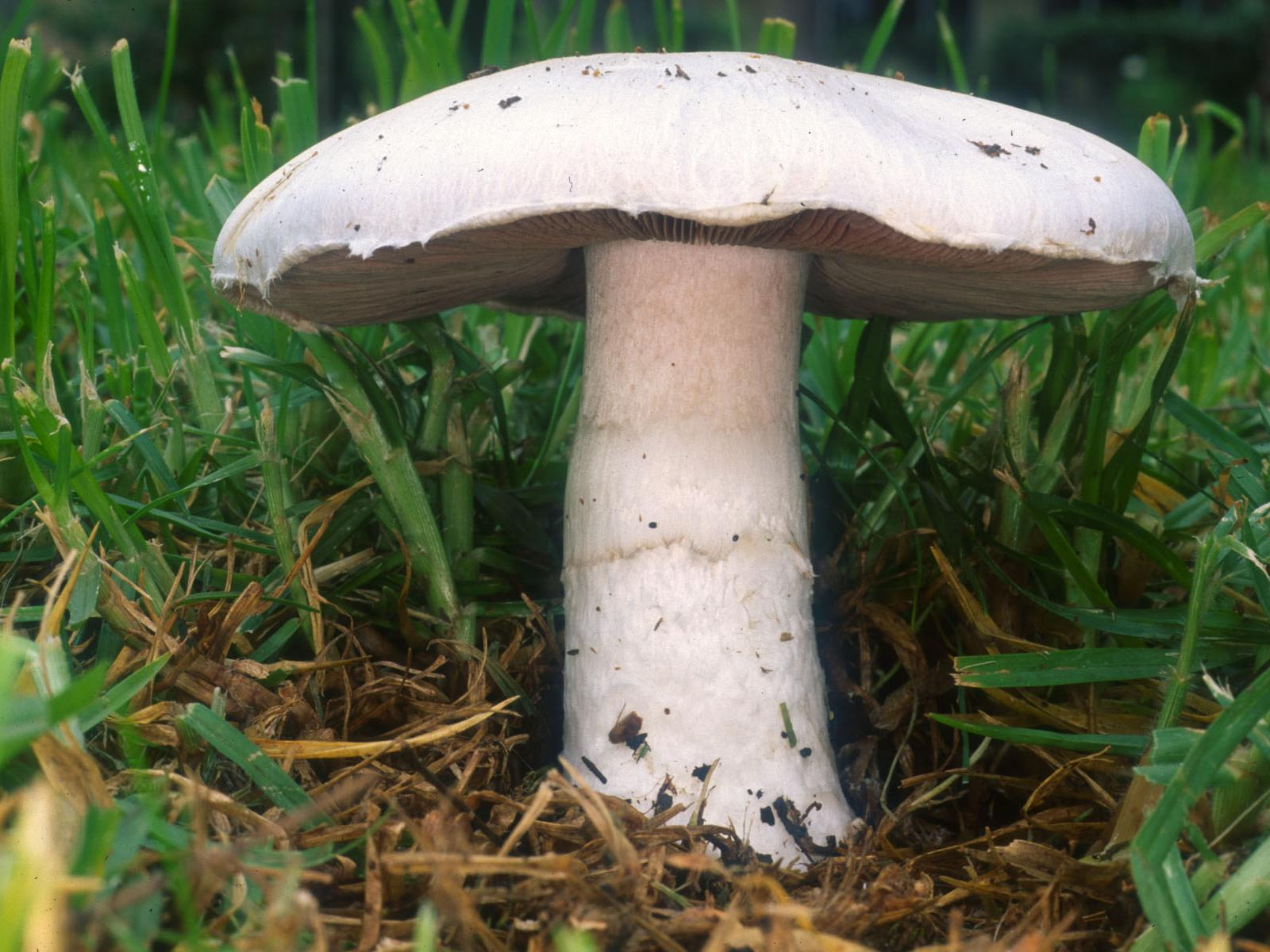
- Agaricus campestris

Scientific classification
- Kingdom: Fungi
- Division: Basidiomycota
- Class: Agaricomycetes
- Order: Agaricales
- Family: Agaricaceae; Chevall. (1826)

Type genus
- Agaricus L. (1753)

Genera
- 85; See text

Synonyms
- Battarraceae Corda (1842); Lepiotaceae Roze (1876); Lycoperdaceae Chevall. (1826); Mycenastraceae Zeller (1948); Tulostomataceae E.Fisch. (1900)

= Agaricaceae =

Agaricaceae Temporal range: Burdigalian–recent

Family of fungi

The Agaricaceae are a family of basidiomycete fungi and include the genus Agaricus, as well as basidiomycetes previously classified in the families Tulostomataceae, Lepiotaceae, and Lycoperdaceae.

== Taxonomy ==
The family Agaricaceae was published by French botanist François Fulgis Chevallier in 1826. It is named after the type genus Agaricus, originally circumscribed by Carl Linnaeus in his 1753 work Species Plantarum. In his authoritative 1986 classification of the Agaricales, Rolf Singer divided the Agaricaceae into four tribes distinguished largely by spore color: Leucocoprineae, Agariceae, Lepioteae, and Cystodermateae. Genera once classified in the families Tulostomataceae, Battarreaceae, Lycoperdaceae, and Mycenastraceae have since been moved to the Agaricaceae based on molecular phylogenetics studies. According to a standard reference text, the Agaricaceae contains 85 genera and 1340 species. In 2024 several Leucoagaricus and Leucocoprinus species were reclassified creating the new genera of Macropsalliota and Candelolepiota.

== Description ==
Agaricaceae species use a wide variety of fruit body morphology. Although the pileate form (i.e., with a cap and stipe) is predominant, gasteroid and secotioid forms are known. In pileate species, the gills are typically thin, and free from attachment to the stipe. Caps are scurfy to smooth, and range from roughly flat to umbonate. They typically have a centrally attached stipe and a membrane-like partial veil. The species formerly classified in the family Lycoperdaceae are also known as the "true puffballs". Their fruiting bodies are round and are composed of a tough skin surrounding a mass of spores. When they mature, the skin splits open and they release their spores.

The spore print color of Agaricaceae species is highly variable, ranging from white to greenish to ochraceous to pink or sepia; rusty-brown or cinnamon brown colours are absent. Microscopically, the spore surface ranges from smooth to ornamented, and the presence of a germ pore is variable. Amyloidity (i.e. sensitivity to staining in Melzer's reagent) is also variable. The basidia (spore-bearing cells) are usually small, four-spored, and may have interspersed cystidia.

== Genera ==
The extinct genus Coprinites is one of four known Agaricaceae genera in the fossil record. Others include Aureofungus, Protomycena, and Archaeomarasmius. Archaeomarasmius leggeti, from Atlantic Coastal Plain amber, is 90–94 Ma); the other fossil genera are from Dominican amber and date to 15–20 Ma.

The family currently includes the following genera:

- Agaricus
- Barcheria
- Bovista
- Calbovista (previously in family Lycoperdaceae)
- Calvatia
- Candelolepiota
- Chamaemyces
- Chlorophyllum
- Clarkeinda
- Coniolepiota
- †Coprinites
- Coprinus
- Cystoagaricus
- Cystolepiota
- Disciseda
- Endoptychum
- Eriocybe
- Gyrophragmium
- Handkea
- Heinemannomyces
- Hymenagaricus
- Lepiota
- Leucoagaricus
- Leucocoprinus
- Lycoperdon
- Macrolepiota
- Macropsalliota
- Melanophyllum
- Micropsalliota
- Montagnea
- Podaxis
- Ripartitella
- Rugosospora
- Sericeomyces
- Smithiomyces
- Tulostoma
- Verrucospora

== Ecology ==
The Agaricaceae are widely distributed. Most species are saprobic and prefer grassland and woodland habitats. Genera Leucoagaricus and Leucocoprinus are known to be cultivated by fungus-growing ants in ant-fungus mutualism.

== Economic significance ==
The genus Agaricus includes some species that are cultivated commercially throughout the world. The common "button mushroom", Agaricus bisporus, is the most widely cultivated edible mushroom. Agaricus blazei is a well-known medicinal mushroom used for a number of therapeutic and medicinal purposes. Several species are poisonous, such as some Lepiota, Agaricus sect. Xanthodermatei and Chlorophyllum species .

== See also ==
- List of Agaricales families
- List of Basidiomycota families
