= Endoptychum =

Scientific classification
- Kingdom: Fungi
- Division: Basidiomycota
- Class: Agaricomycetes
- Order: Agaricales
- Family: Agaricaceae
- Genus: Endoptychum; Czern. (1845)

Type species
- Endoptychum agaricoides Czern. (1845)

Genus of fungi

Endoptychum is a genus of secotioid fungi in the family Agaricaceae. Like the majority of secotioid taxa, the individual species of Endoptychum are thought to be recent mutations from agaricoid species, hence, Endoptychum is likely not a valid monophyletic genus.

So far, molecular phylogeny and morphological study has revealed that E. depressum is a species of Agaricus and E. agaricoides, the type species, is a species of Chlorophyllum. E. depressum has been renamed Agaricus inapertus Vellinga. Recognition of the name Chlorophyllum agaricoides (Czern.) Vellinga would entail deprecation of the entire genus name Endoptychum in favor of Chlorophyllum and awaits a formal decision of the International Botanical Congress.

== See also ==
- List of Agaricaceae genera
- List of Agaricales genera
