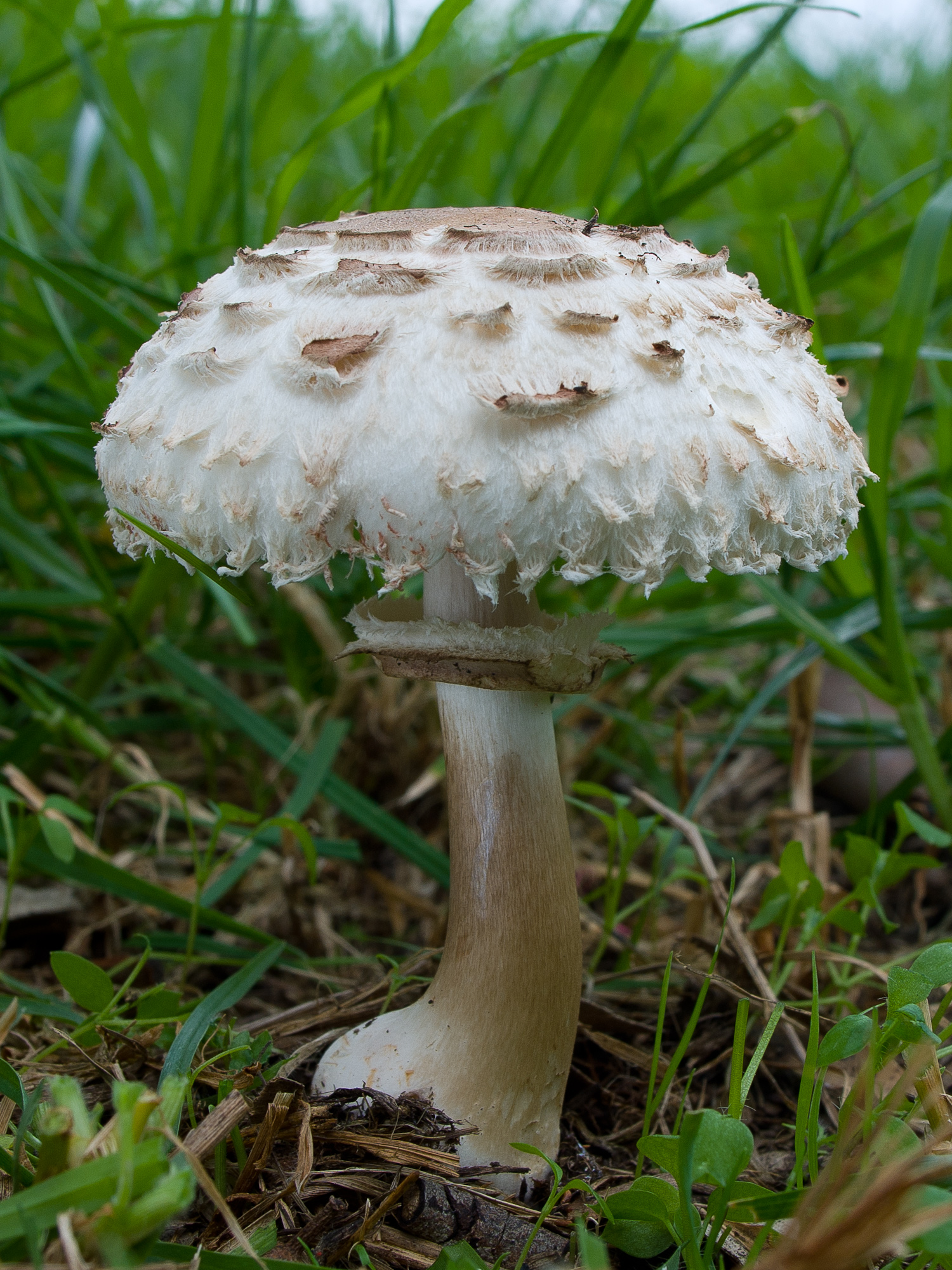

Scientific classification
- Domain: Eukaryota
- Kingdom: Fungi
- Division: Basidiomycota
- Class: Agaricomycetes
- Order: Agaricales
- Family: Agaricaceae
- Genus: Chlorophyllum
- Species: C. nothorachodes

Binomial name
- Chlorophyllum nothorachodes Vellinga & Lepp (2003)

= Chlorophyllum nothorachodes =

Species of fungus

Chlorophyllum nothorachodes is a species of agaric fungus in the family Agaricaceae. Found in Australia, it was officially described in 2003 from a collection made from a garden in Stirling, Australian Capital Territory. The fruit bodies of the fungus have caps up to 28 cm (11 in) wide covered with dark brown patches and small scales. The gills are free from attachment to the stipe and closely crowded. The spores are thick walled and measure 9–12 by 6–8 μm; the basidia (spore-bearing cells) are four-spored, lack clamps at their bases, and have dimensions of 29–36 by 9–11 μm. Cheilocystidia, which also lack a clamp at the base, measure 22–44 by 6.5–17 μm. The species epithet derives from the Ancient Greek νόθος ("false") and rachodes, referring to its resemblance to Chlorophyllum rhacodes.
