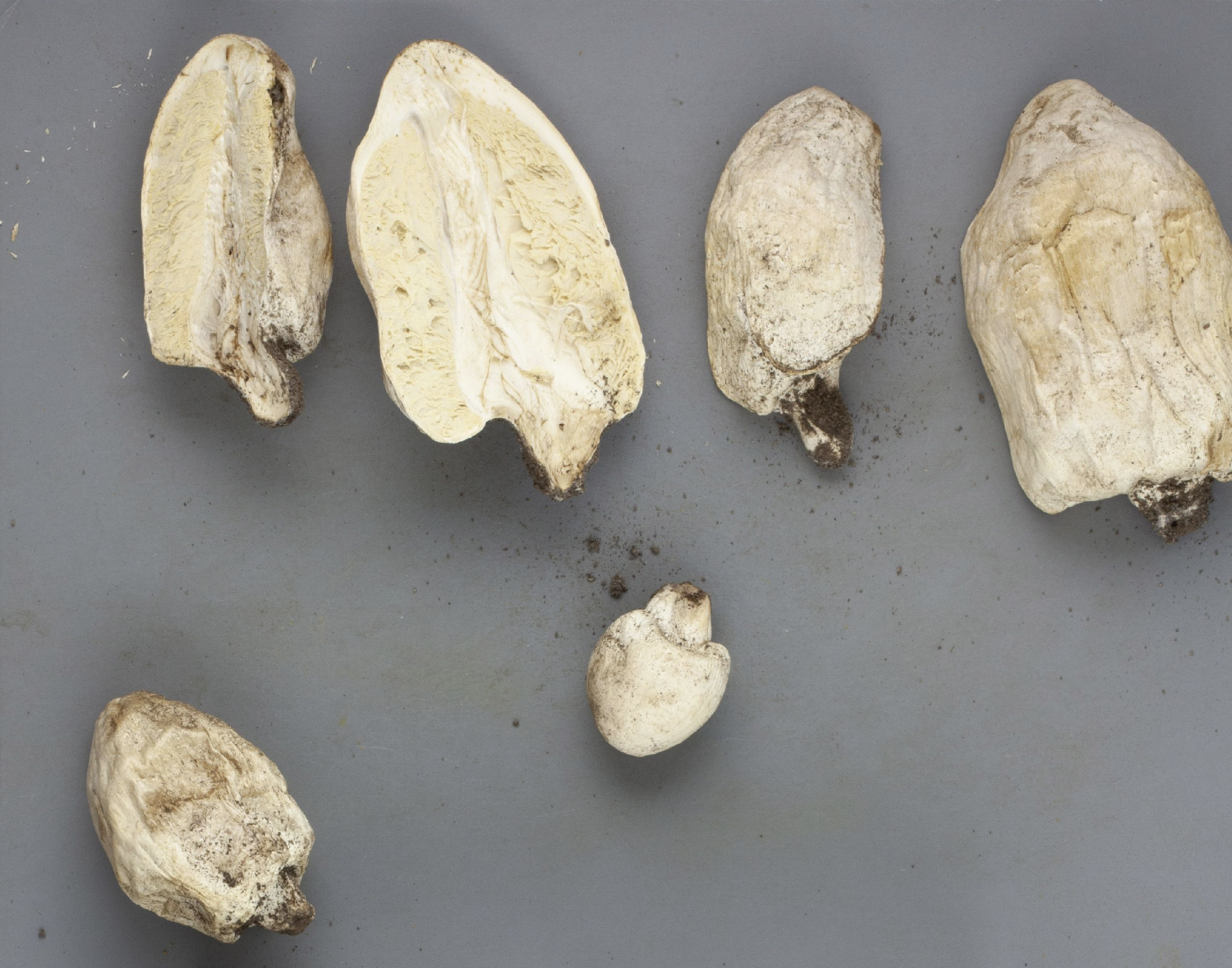

Scientific classification
- Domain: Eukaryota
- Kingdom: Fungi
- Division: Basidiomycota
- Class: Agaricomycetes
- Order: Agaricales
- Family: Agaricaceae
- Genus: Chlorophyllum
- Species: C. agaricoides

Binomial name
- Chlorophyllum agaricoides (Czern.) Vellinga

Synonyms
- Endoptychum agaricoides Czernajew, V.M. (1845)

= Chlorophyllum agaricoides =

Species of fungus

Chlorophyllum agaricoides Mycological characteristics
- Glebal hymenium
- Cap is conical
- Hymenium attachment is not applicable
- Stipe is bare
- Spore print is olive-brown
- Ecology is saprotrophic
- Edibility is edible or inedible

Chlorophyllum agaricoides, commonly known as the gasteroid lepiota, puffball parasol, false puffball, or puffball agaric, is a species of fungus in the family Agaricaceae.

== Description ==
It is a secotioid mushroom, meaning its hymenium takes the form of a gleba made of underdeveloped gills, completely enclosed by the cap, which never fully opens. This protects the mushroom from desiccation. The cap is egg-shaped to spherical, often tapering upward to form a blunt, conical point 1–7 centimetres (1/2–2 3/4 in) wide and 2–10 cm tall. It is white, and becomes brownish with age. It may have some small fibrils or develop fibrous scales. The gills are contorted, irregularly chambered, and underdeveloped, making up an enclosed gleba which is white, aging to a mustardy yellow-brown. The stipe is up to 3 cm long and 0.5–2 cm thick. There is no ring. Its odor becomes cabbagey with age. It grows singularly or in clusters mostly on cultivated land or grass, though occasionally on the forest floor. The spores are 6.5–9.5 x 5–7 μm, globose to elliptic, green to yellow-brown, turning reddish brown in Melzer's reagent. The germ pore is indistinct. Cheilocystidia and pleurocystidia are absent.

Agaricus inapertus is a look-alike, although unlike C. agaricoides, it prefers forests and develops a black gleba with age.

== Distribution and habitat ==
It has a cosmopolitan distribution, with documented records from China, Mongolia, Bulgaria, and Turkey. It is also a protected species in Hungary and is believed to be in decline across Europe due to habitat destruction.

== Uses ==
Young specimens have been traditionally eaten by the Turkish for many years.
