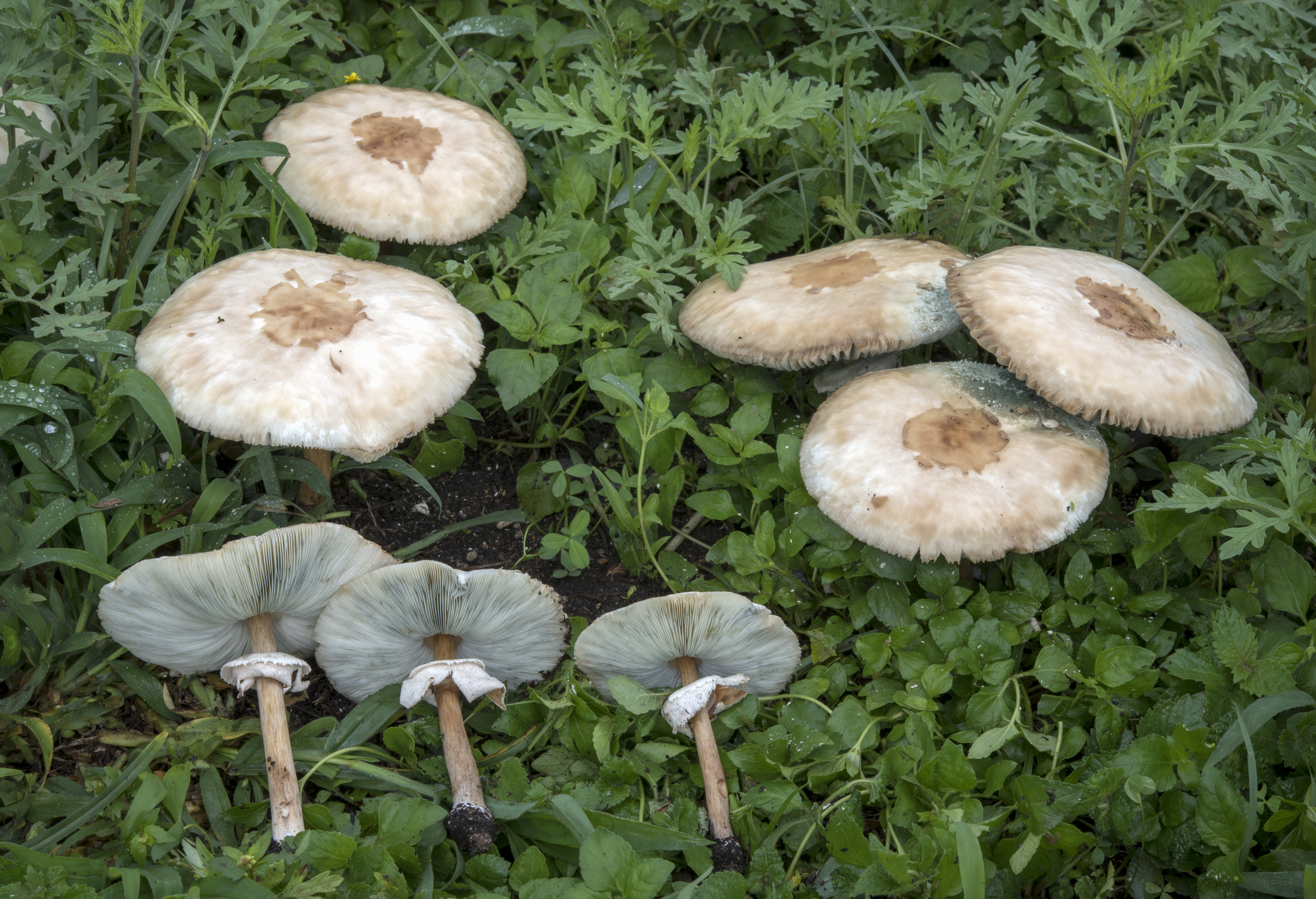

Scientific classification
- Kingdom: Fungi
- Division: Basidiomycota
- Class: Agaricomycetes
- Order: Agaricales
- Family: Agaricaceae
- Genus: Chlorophyllum
- Species: C. molybdites

Binomial name
- Chlorophyllum molybdites (G. Mey.) Massee (1898)

Synonyms
- Agaricus molybdites Lepiota molybdites Leucocoprinus molybdites Macrolepiota molybdites Lepiota morgani

= Chlorophyllum molybdites =

Green-spored parasol Chlorophyllum molybdites

Species of fungus

Chlorophyllum molybdites
- Mycological characteristics
- Gills on hymenium
- Cap is flat
- Hymenium is free
- Stipe has a ring
- Spore print is green
- Ecology is saprotrophic
- Edibility is poisonous

Chlorophyllum molybdites, commonly known as the green-spored parasol, green-gill parasol, false parasol, green-spored lepiota and vomiter, is a common species of mushroom found in temperate and subtropical meadows and lawns.

The species is poisonous and causes potentially serious vomiting and diarrhea. It is the most commonly consumed poisonous mushroom in North America, often being misidentified as edible species like Chlorophyllum rhacodes (the shaggy parasol) and Macrolepiota procera (parasol mushroom).

== Description ==
The pileus (cap) ranges from 8 to 30 cm (3.1 to 12 in) in diameter, hemispherical and with a flattened top. The cap is whitish in colour with coarse brownish scales. The gills are free and white, usually turning dark and green with maturity. It is the only large mushroom that has a green spore print. The stipe ranges from 5 to 30 cm (2.0 to 12 in) tall and bears a double-edged ring. Its stem lacks the snakeskin pattern that is generally present on the parasol mushroom. The flesh is thick, and though firm at first, softens with age. It is white, though the base of the foot can sporadically become reddish-brown to pale reddish-pink or almost orange when cut or crushed.

== Distribution and habitat ==
Chlorophyllum molybdites grows in meadows, lawns and parks across eastern North America, as well as temperate and subtropical regions around the world. Fruiting bodies generally appear after summer and autumn rains. It appears to have spread to other countries, with reports from Scotland, Australia, and Cyprus.

Chlorophyllum molybdites is sometimes called fairy ring mushroom since it often forms fairy rings.

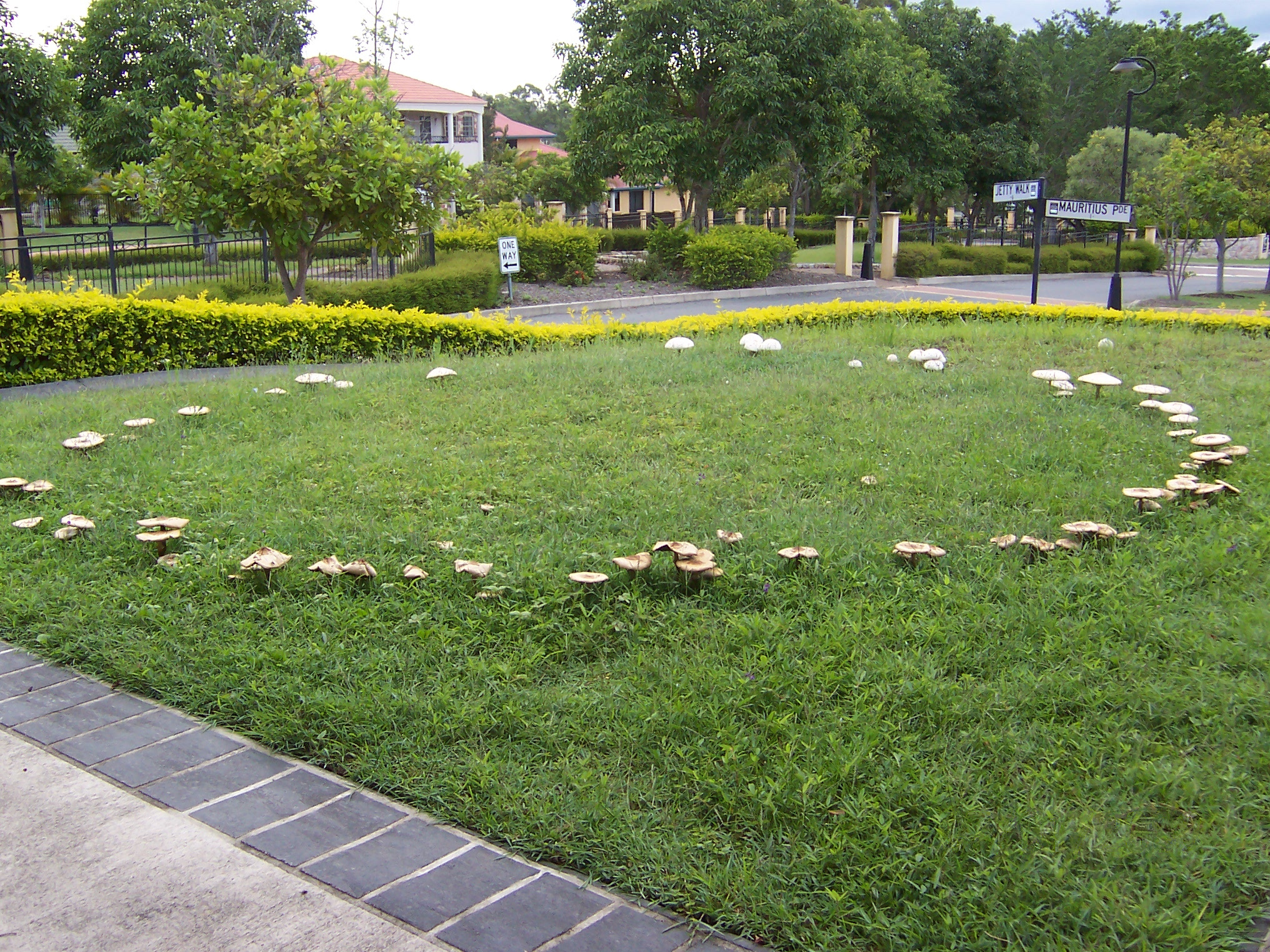
Fairy ring about 2 meters diameter, Queensland, Australia

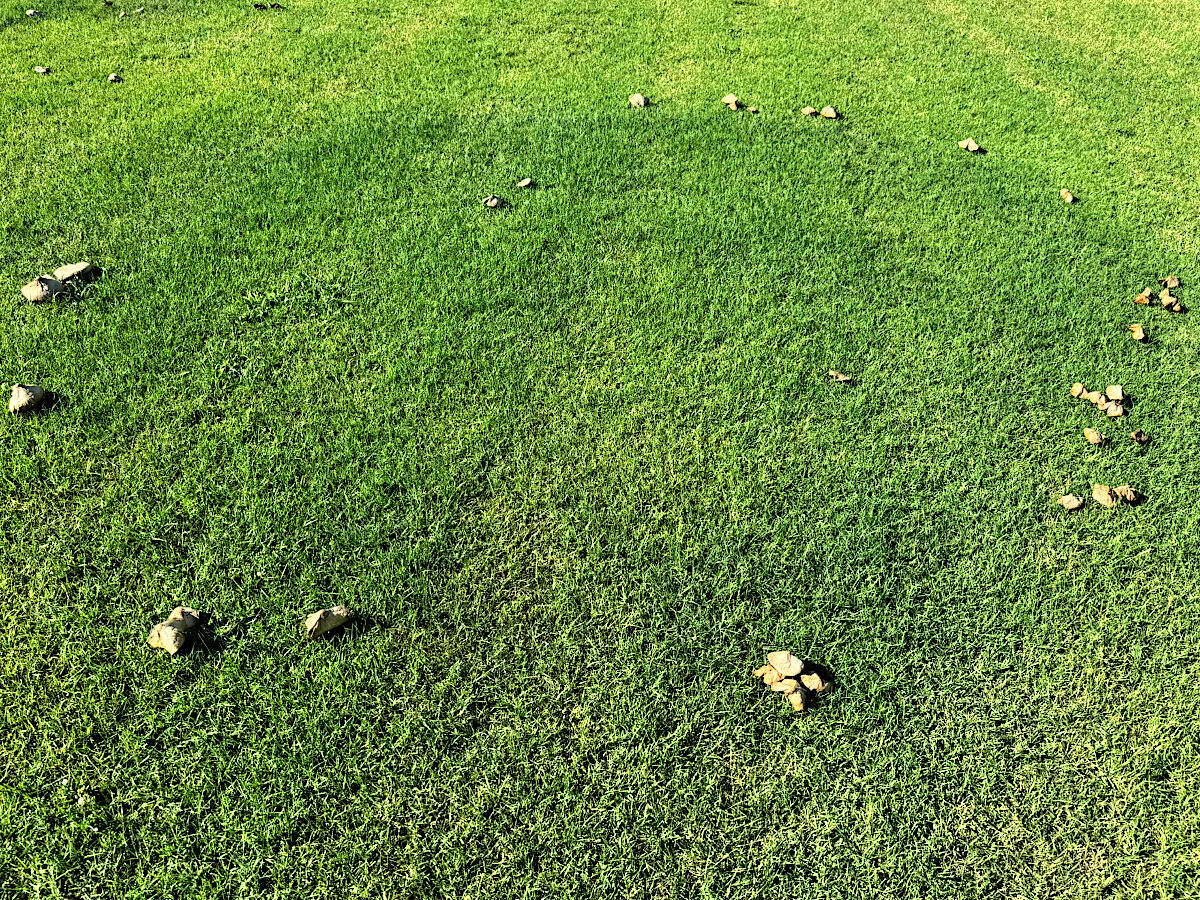
Fairy ring about 6 meters diameter, Arizona, US

== Toxicity ==
Chlorophyllum molybdites is the most frequently eaten poisonous mushroom in North America. The symptoms, likely caused by the chemical compound molybdophyllysin, are predominantly gastrointestinal in nature, with vomiting, diarrhea and abdominal pains, often severe, occurring 1–3 hours after consumption. Although these poisonings can be severe, particularly in children, deaths from these mushrooms have been incredibly rare (and have mainly occurred in small children and dogs). Professor James Kimbrough writes:

Chlorophyllum molybdites, the green-spored Morgan's Lepiota, is responsible for the greatest number of cases of mushroom poisonings in North America, and in Florida. This is probably due to the fact that it is easily confused with choice edible species such as Lepiota procera and L. rhacodes, and it is one of the most common mushrooms found on lawns and pastures throughout the country, with the exception of the Pacific Northwest. When eaten raw C. molybdites produce severe symptoms, including bloody stools, within a couple of hours. When cooked well, or parboiled and decanting the liquid before cooking, others eat and enjoy it. Eilers and Nelso (1974) found a heat-labile, high molecular weight protein which showed an adverse effect when given by intraperitoneal injection into laboratory animals.

Cases of poisoning from these mushrooms are also reported in Malaysia, where they are often mistaken for Termitomyces mushrooms that are found locally. It also might be confused for Coprinus comatus (shaggy mane).

== Gallery ==
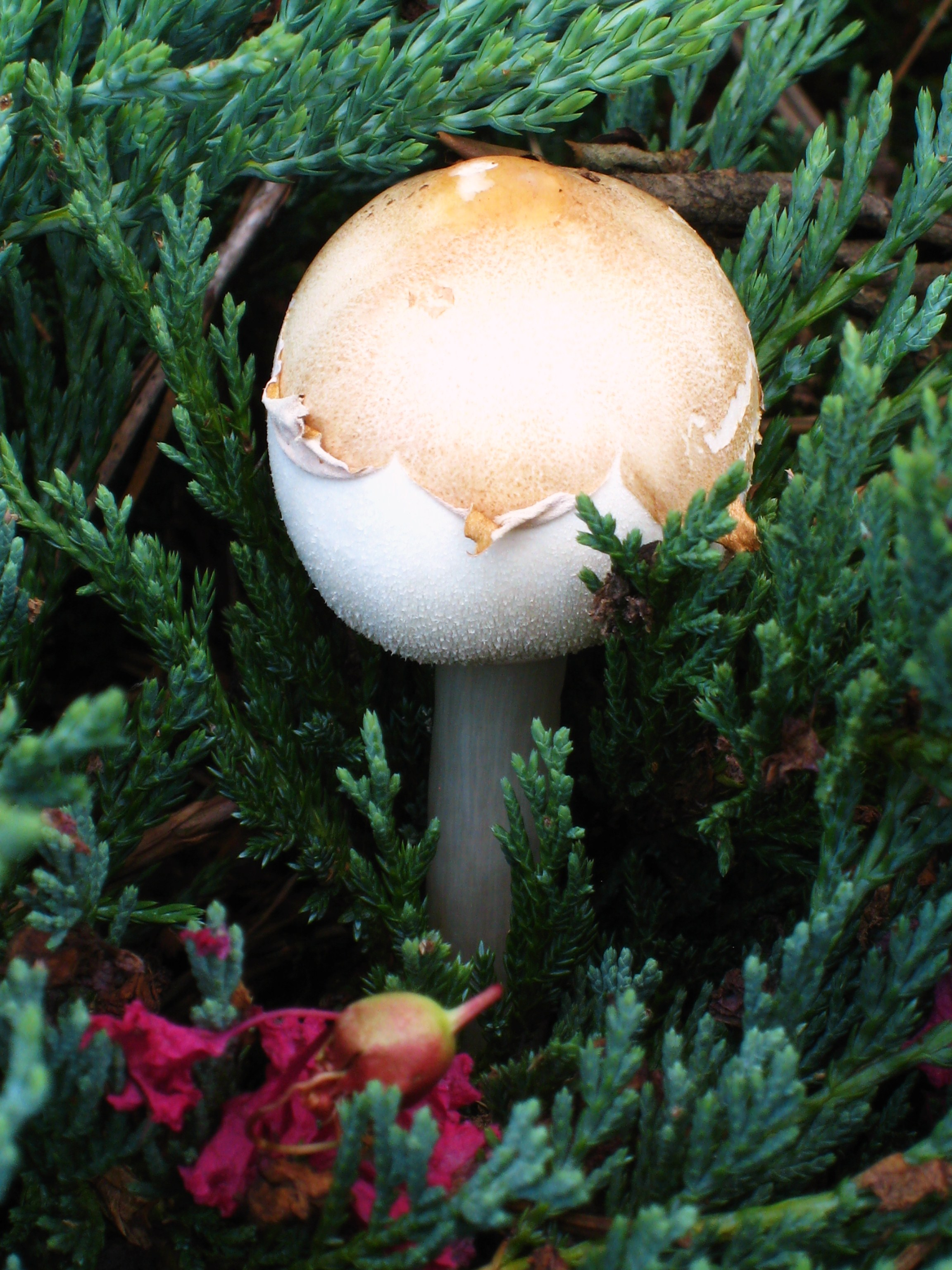
Young specimen of Chlorohyllum molybdites

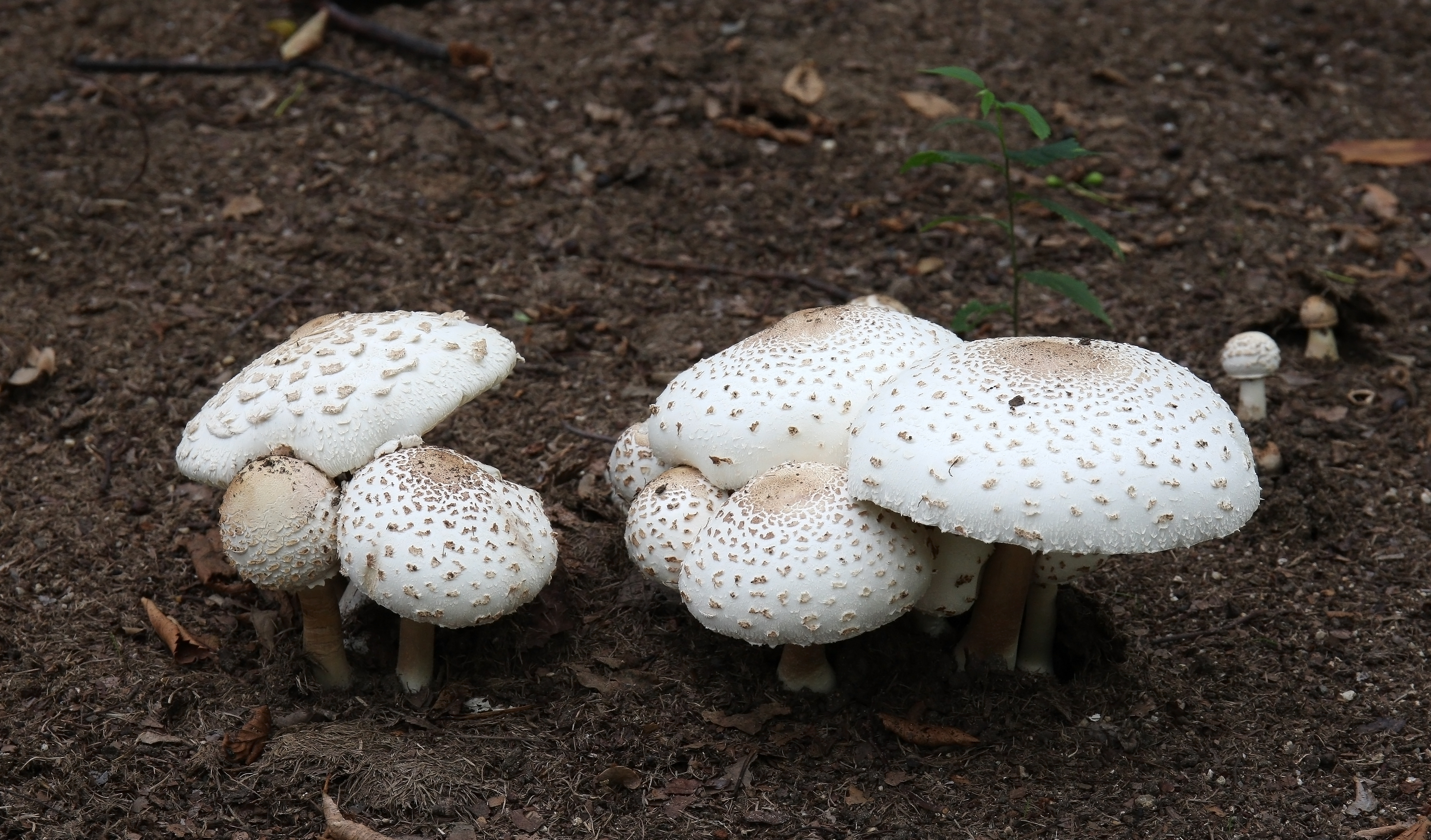
In Osaka

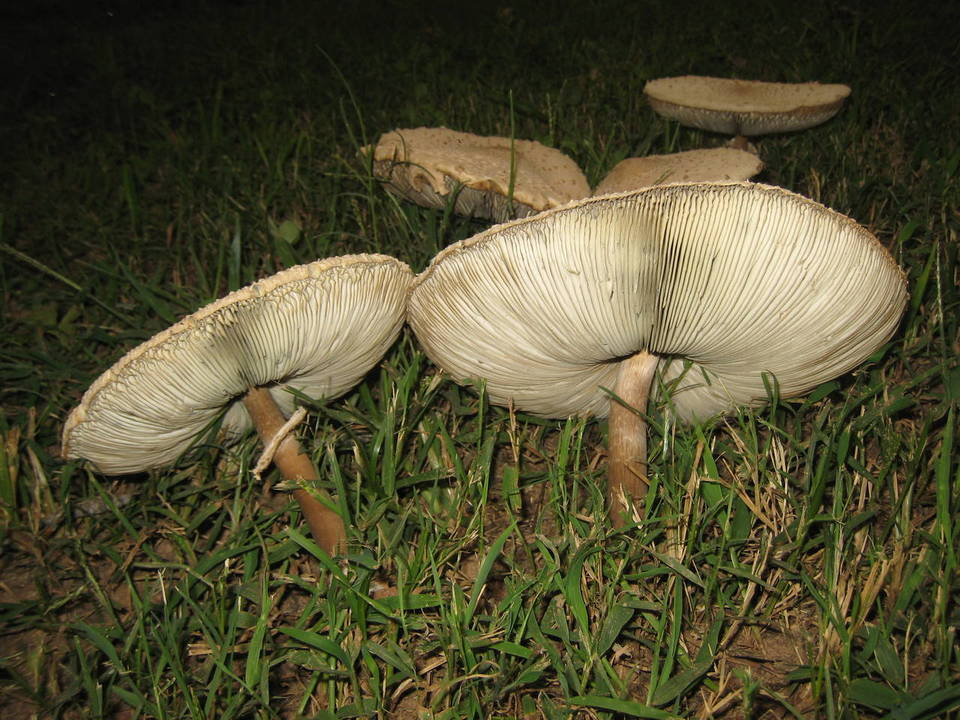
Chlorophyllum molybdites

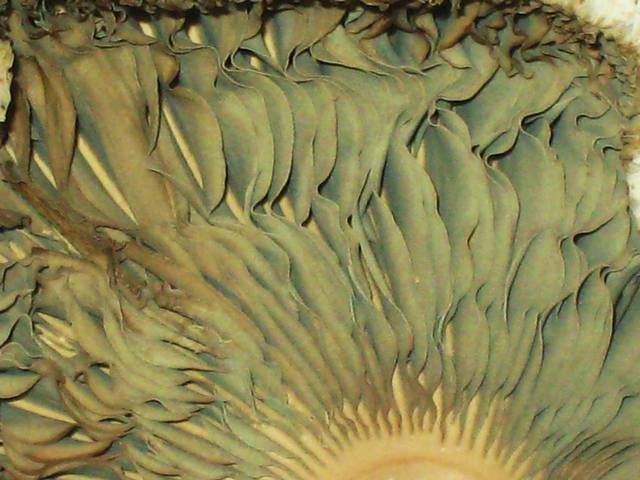
Chlorophyllum molybdites

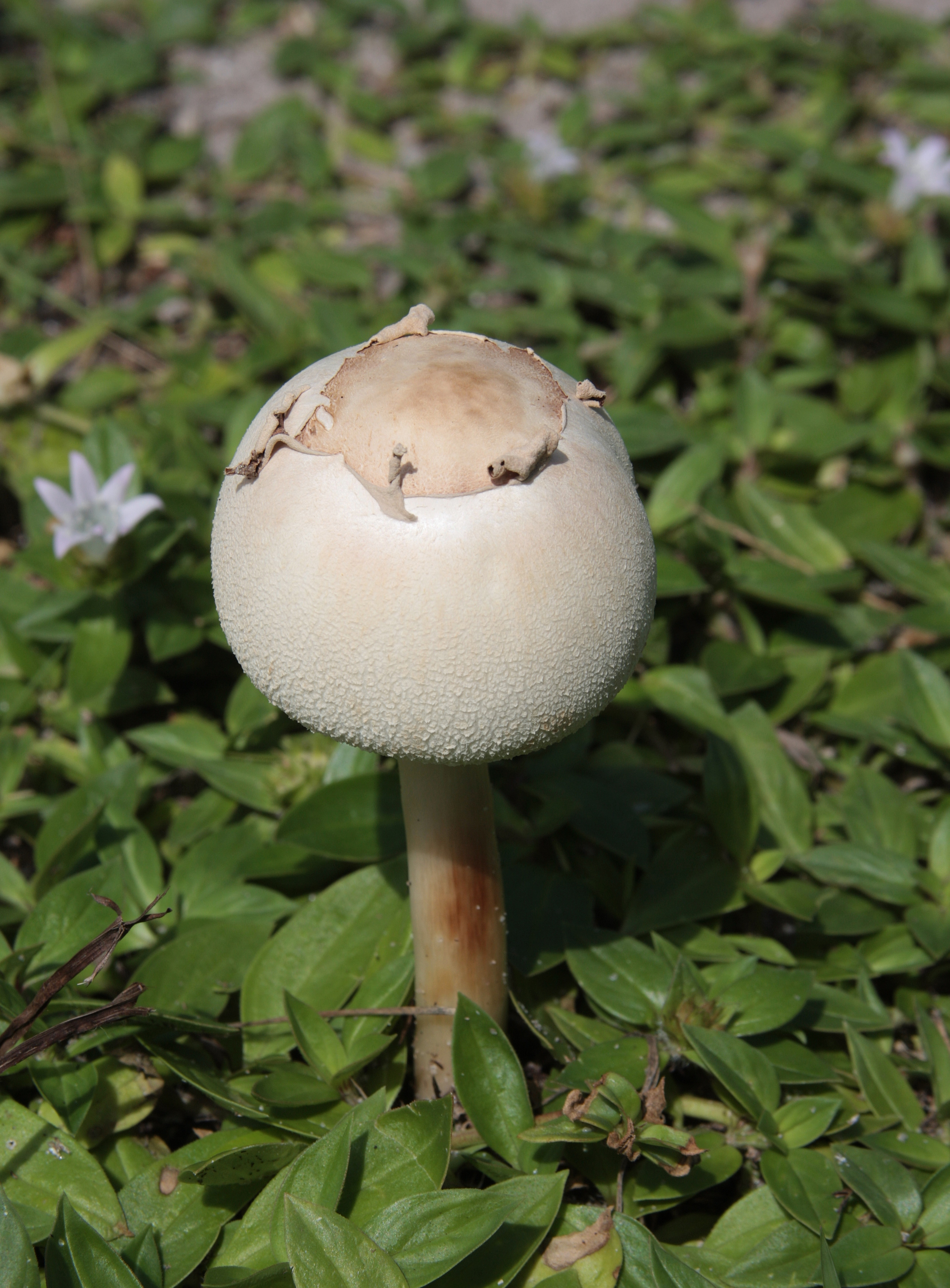
A young false parasol mushroom

Chlorophyllum molybdites spore print showing its green color

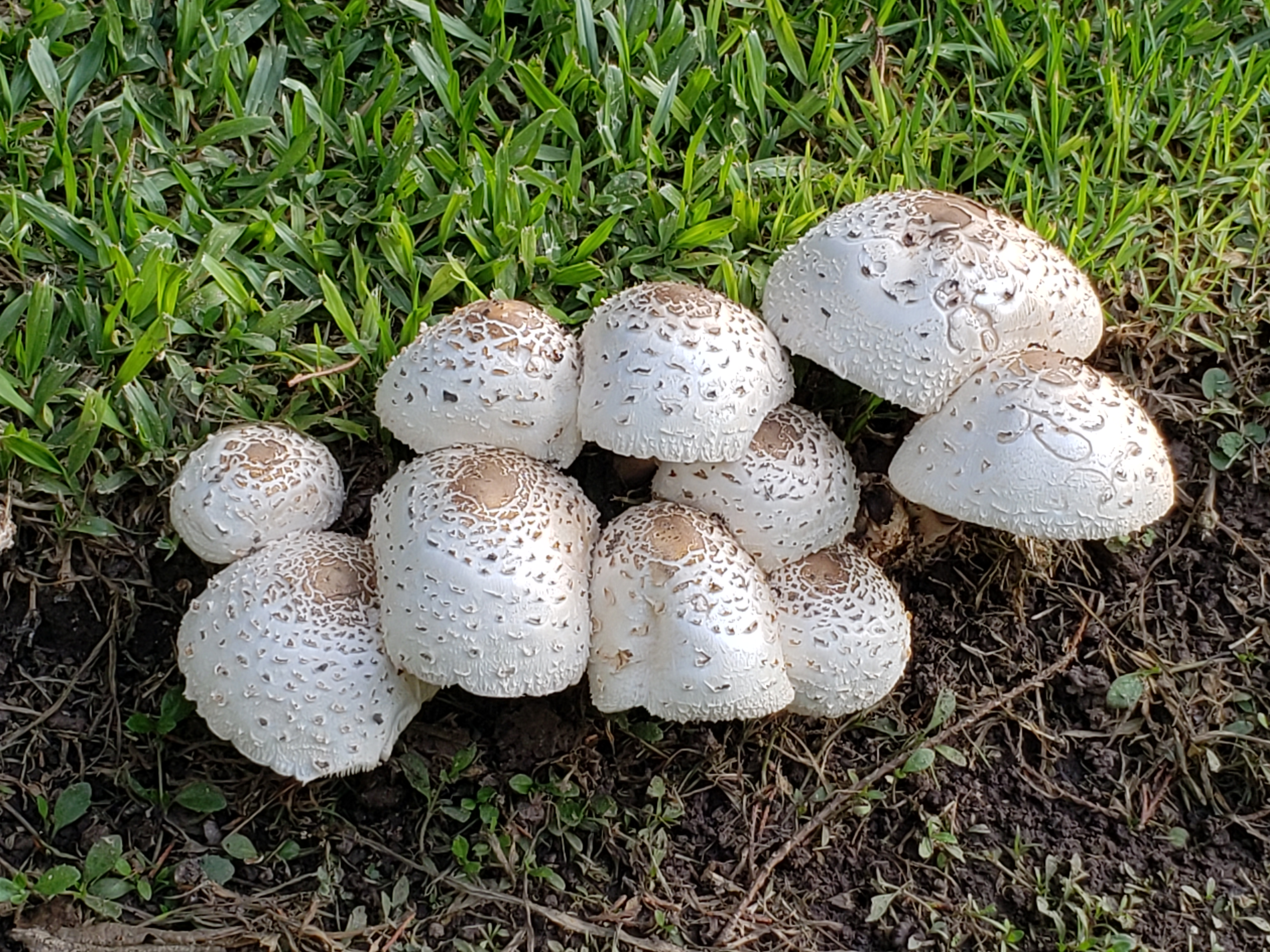
Chlorophyllum molybdites registered in Escobar, Buenos Aires Province, Argentina

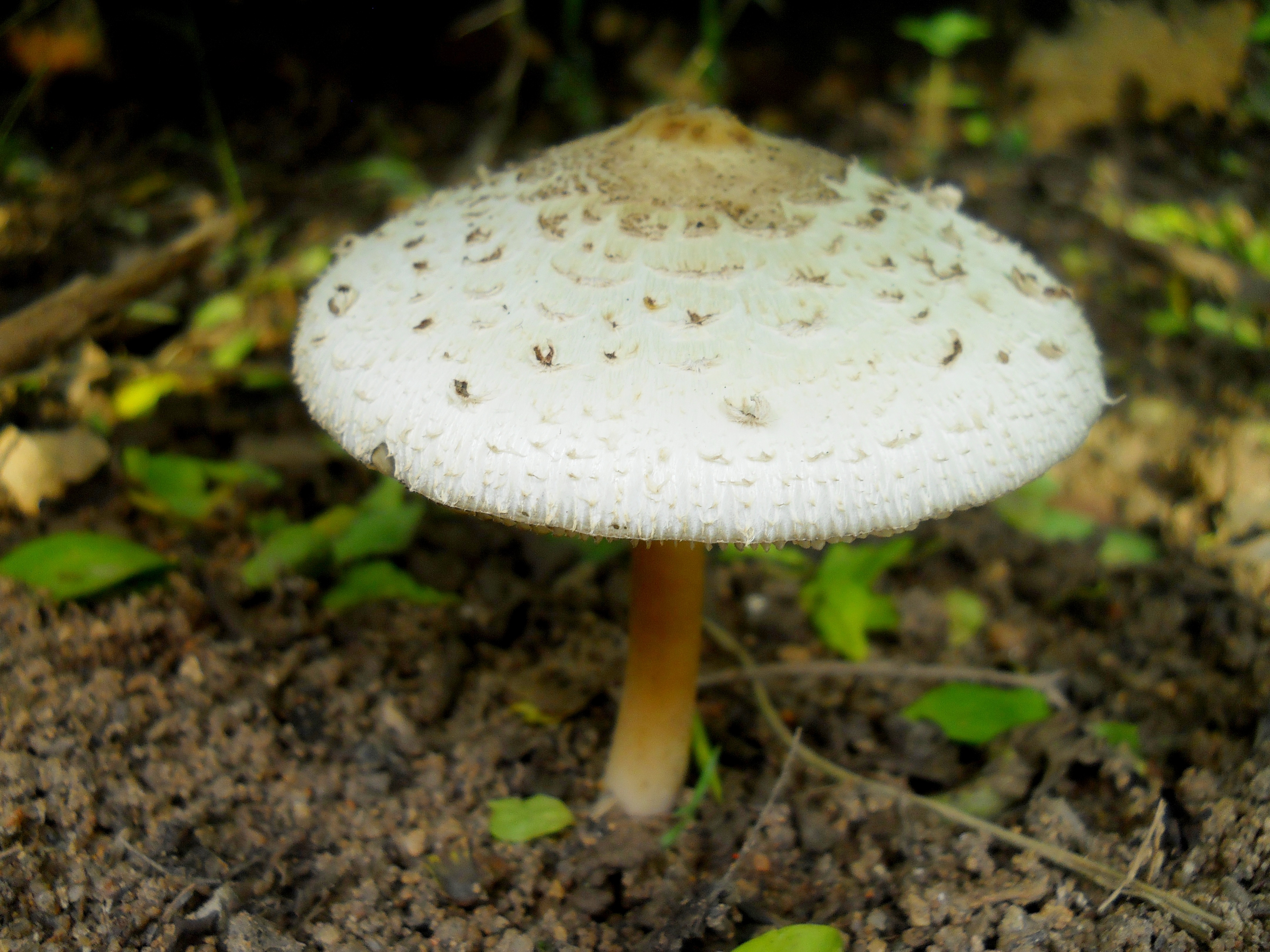
Chlorophyllum molybdites in Ranchi, India

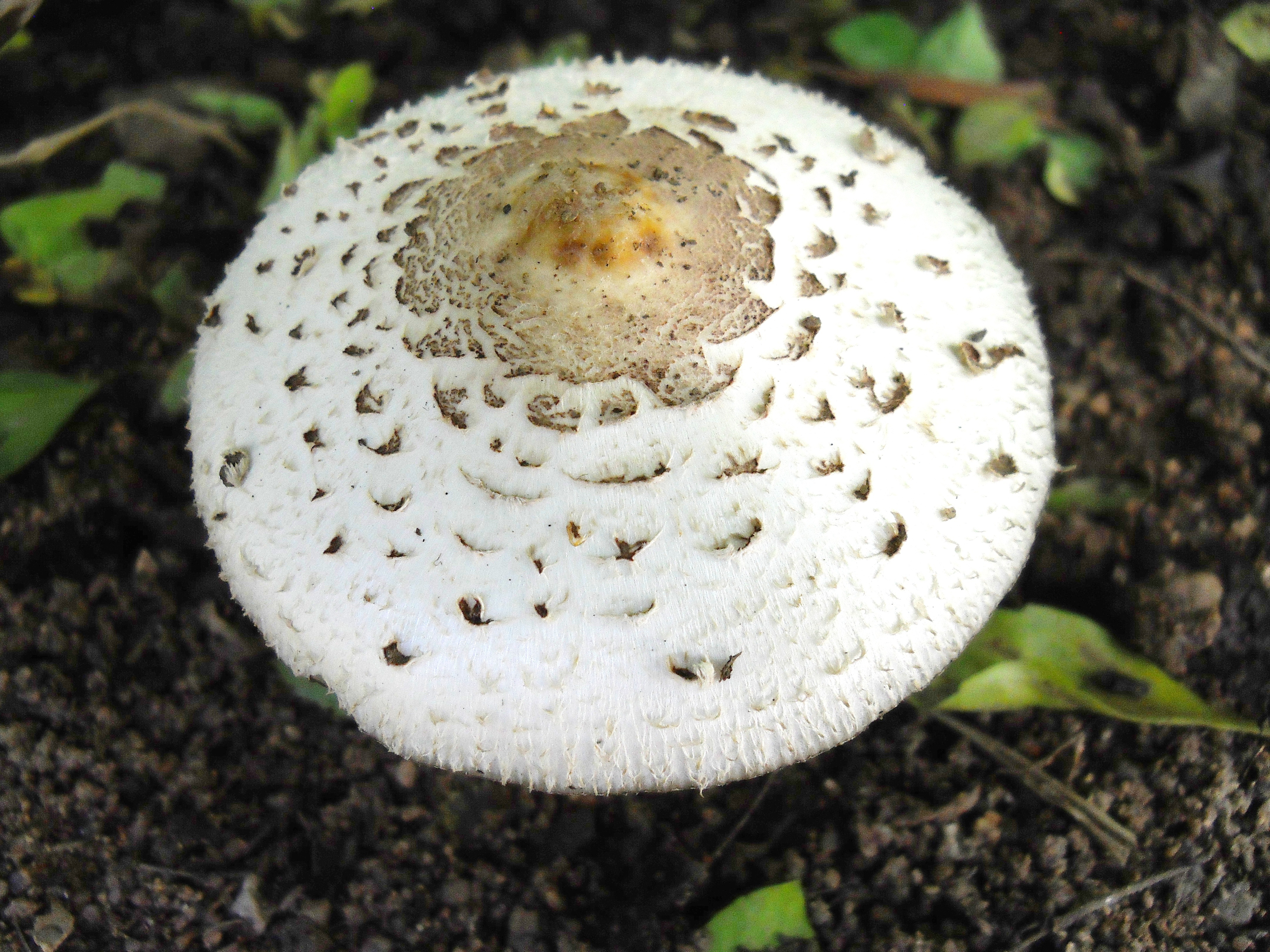
Chlorophyllum molybdites in Ranchi, India

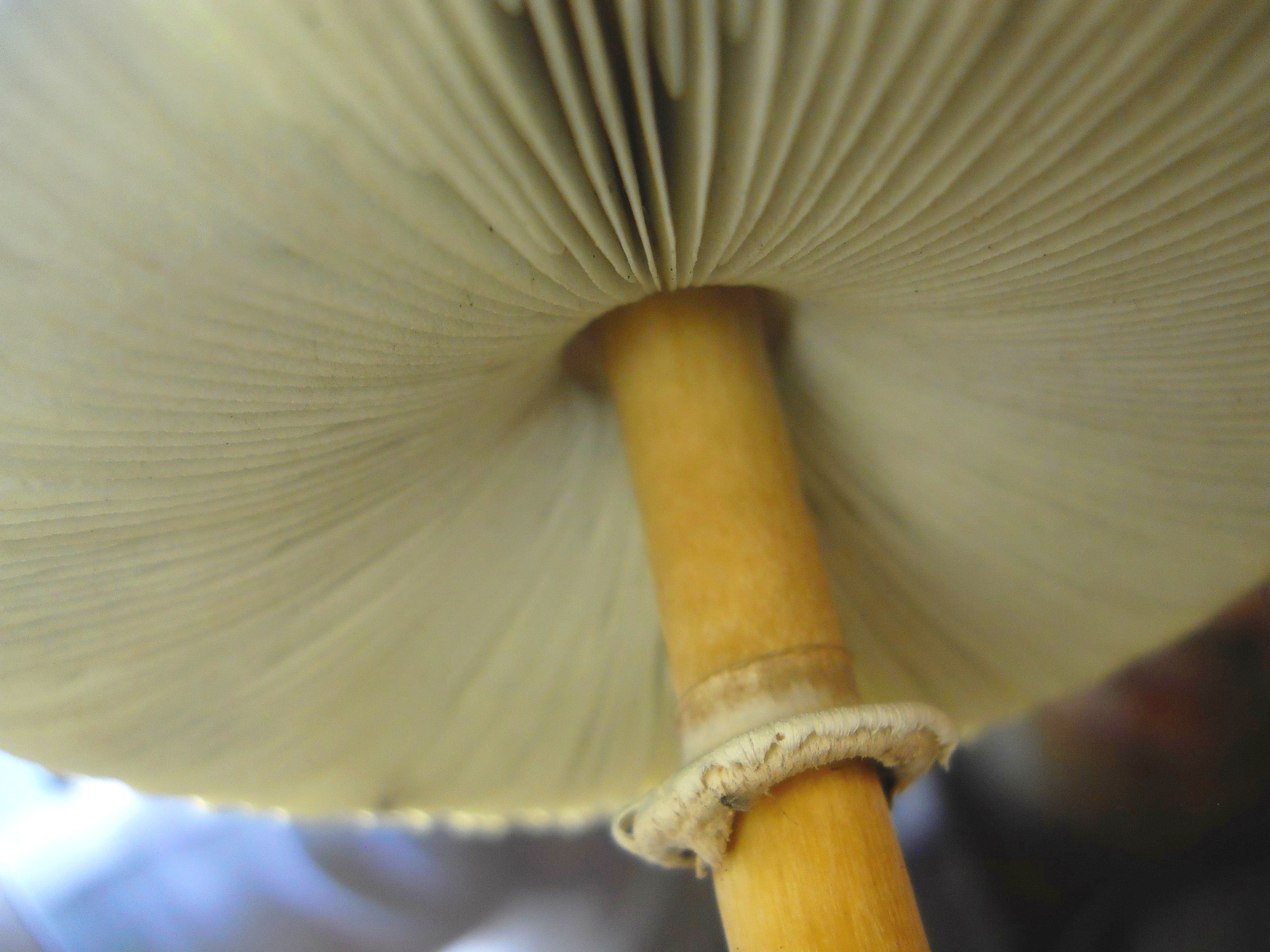
Chlorophyllum molybdites underside of the cap

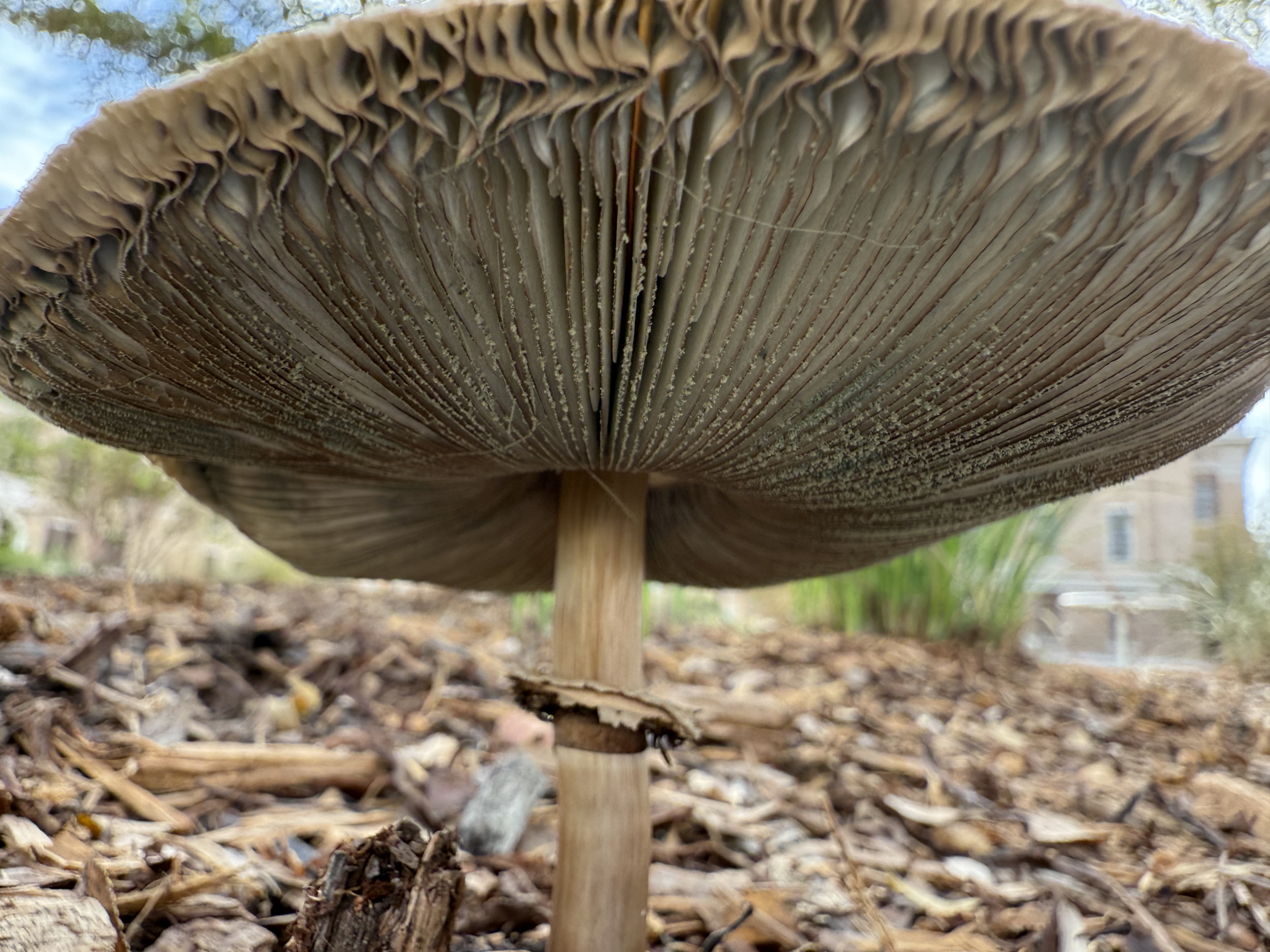
The species' green spores on a mature fruiting body
