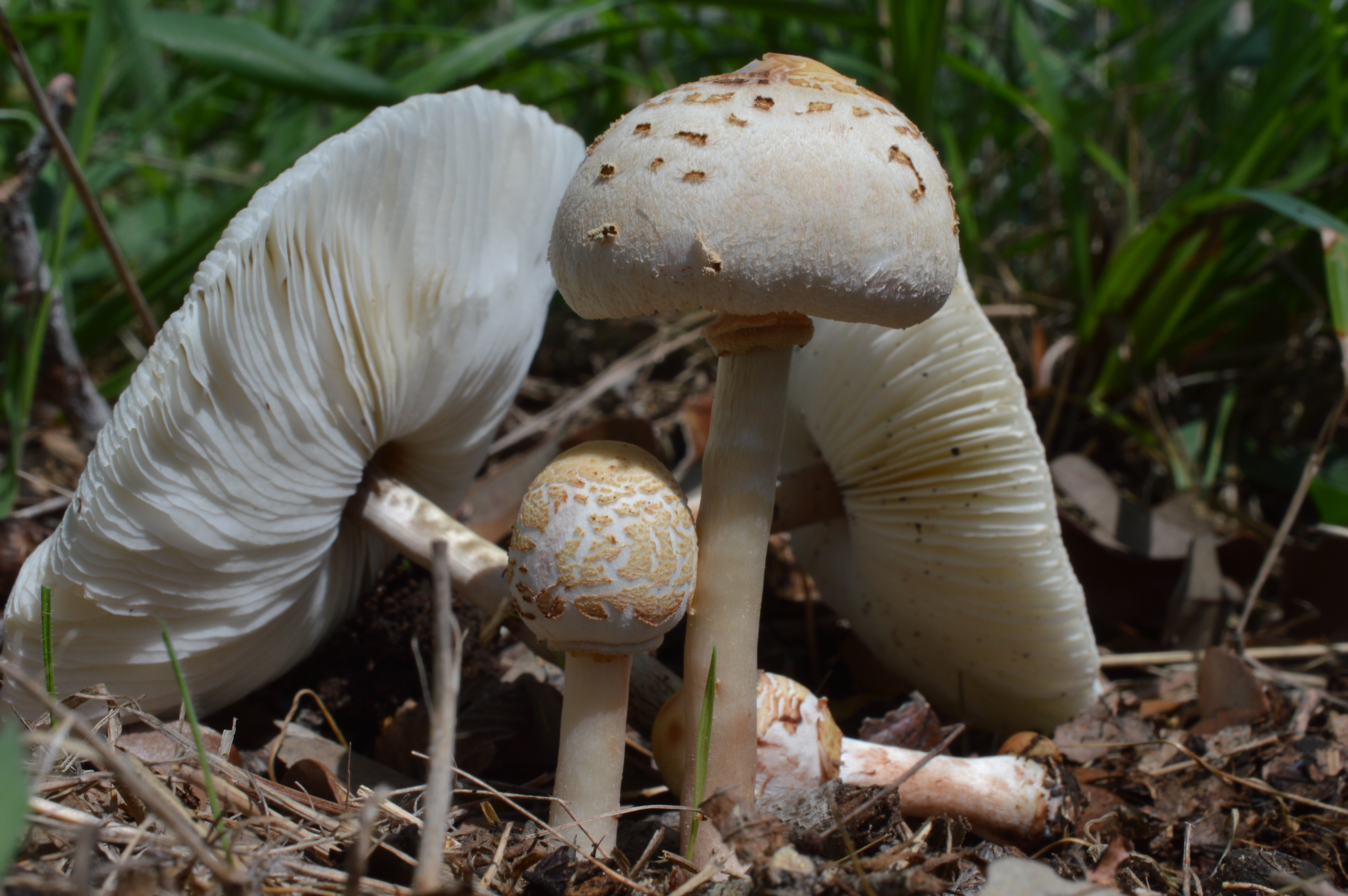

Scientific classification
- Domain: Eukaryota
- Kingdom: Fungi
- Division: Basidiomycota
- Class: Agaricomycetes
- Order: Agaricales
- Family: Agaricaceae
- Genus: Chlorophyllum
- Species: C. hortense

Binomial name
- Chlorophyllum hortense (Murrill) Vellinga (2002)

Synonyms
- Lepiota hortensis Murrill (1917); Leucoagaricus hortensis Pegler (1983)

= Chlorophyllum hortense =

Species of fungus

Chlorophyllum hortense Mycological characteristics
- Gills on hymenium
- Cap is convex or umbonate
- Hymenium is free
- Stipe has a ring
- Spore print is white
- Ecology is saprotrophic
- Edibility is unknown

Chlorophyllum hortense is a species of agaric fungus in the family Agaricaceae.

== Taxonomy ==
It was first described in 1914 by the American mycologist William Murrill who classified it as Lepiota hortensis.

In 1983 it was reclassified as Leucoagaricus hortensis by the British mycologist David Pegler.

In 2002 it was reclassified as Chlorophyllum hortense by Else C.Vellinga.

== Description ==
Cap: 8-10cm wide when mature, starting convex and slightly umbonate before expanding. The surface is a dirty yellowish white colour, dry and covered in thread like filaments (fibrillose) whilst the centre disc is light brown and covered with large light brown woolly (floccose) scales. The cap edges are thick, rounded and the same colour as the cap surface with distinct striations. Stem: 5-7cm long and 7-10mm thick, mostly equal in thickness across the length but sometimes slightly wider below the stem ring. The surface is smooth and white above the stem ring and usually brown and fibrillose below whilst the interior is tough and solid. The stem ring is thick, brown and located towards below or at the middle of the stem (inferior to median). Gills: Free, crowded and white, unchanging in colour. There is a slight bulge in the middle of the gills (ventricose). Spores: Ellipsoid and smooth. 8-9 x 6-7μm.

== Habitat and distribution ==
The fungus is found in Australia and North America. In 2006, it was reported from China.

Murrill described the species from specimens collected in sandy soil in Alabama.
