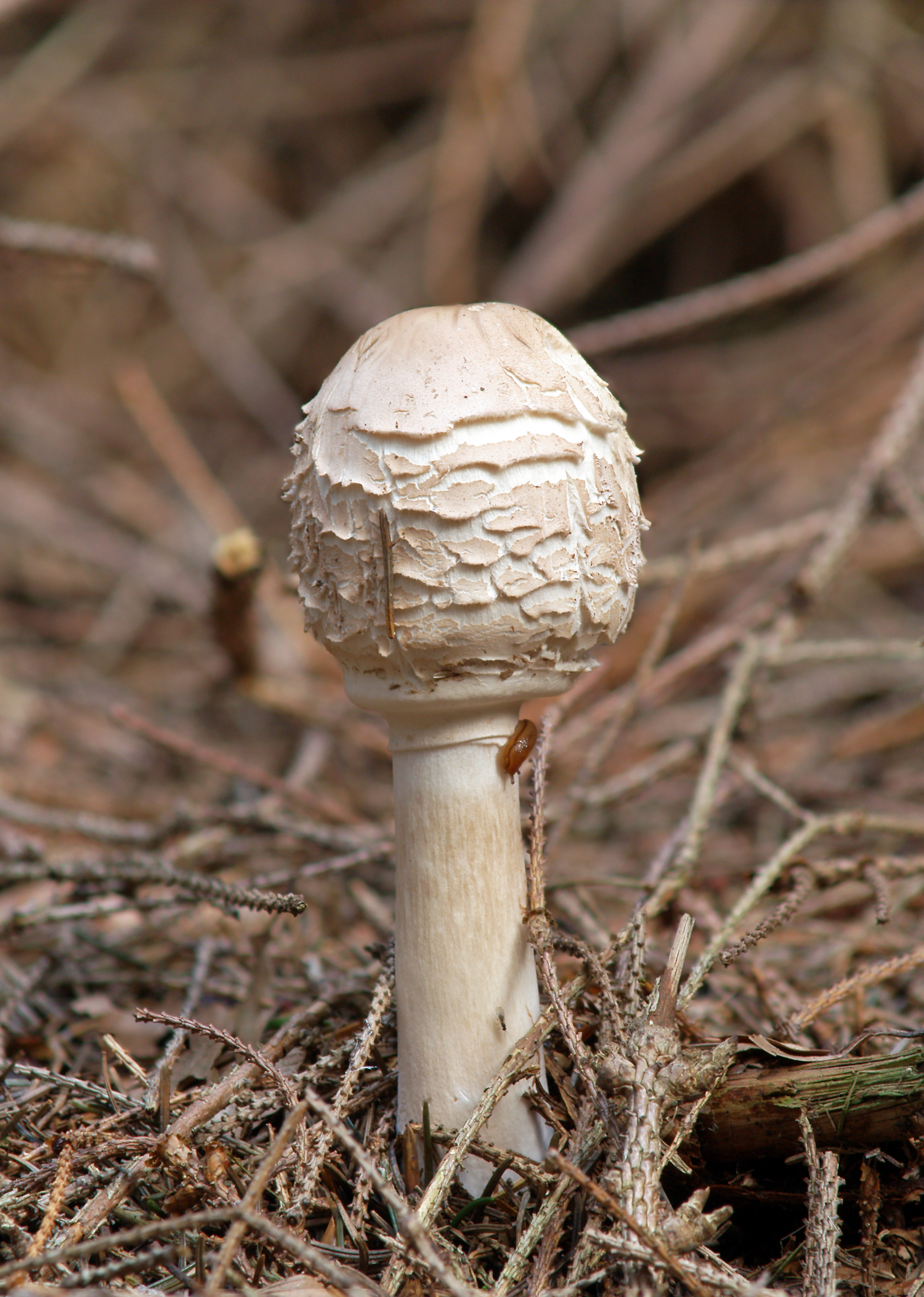
- Shaggy parasol

Scientific classification
- Kingdom: Fungi
- Division: Basidiomycota
- Class: Agaricomycetes
- Order: Agaricales
- Family: Agaricaceae
- Genus: Chlorophyllum; Massee (1898)

Type species
- Chlorophyllum esculentum Massee (1898)

= Chlorophyllum =

Genus of fungi

Chlorophyllum is a genus of large toadstools that are similar in appearance to the true parasol mushroom (Macrolepiota). The genus Chlorophyllum was originally created in 1898, a time when spore color was the deciding factor for differentiating genera. It was termed in order to describe the poisonous green-spored C. molybdites which shared many characteristics of the mushrooms within the genus Lepiota but lacked the all-important white spores. The name derives from Greek Chloro meaning green and phyllo meaning leaf (or gill in this case). It remained as a monotypic genus until recently when modern DNA analyses concluded that many of the mushrooms contained in the genus Macrolepiota actually had more in common genetically with the Chlorophyllum molybdites than with the other members of the Macrolepiota. The genus has a widespread distribution, with many species found in tropical regions. The best known members are the edible shaggy parasol, a name applied to three very similar species Chlorophyllum rhacodes, C. olivieri and C. brunneum, and the poisonous C. molybdites, which is widespread in subtropical regions around the world.

== Gallery ==
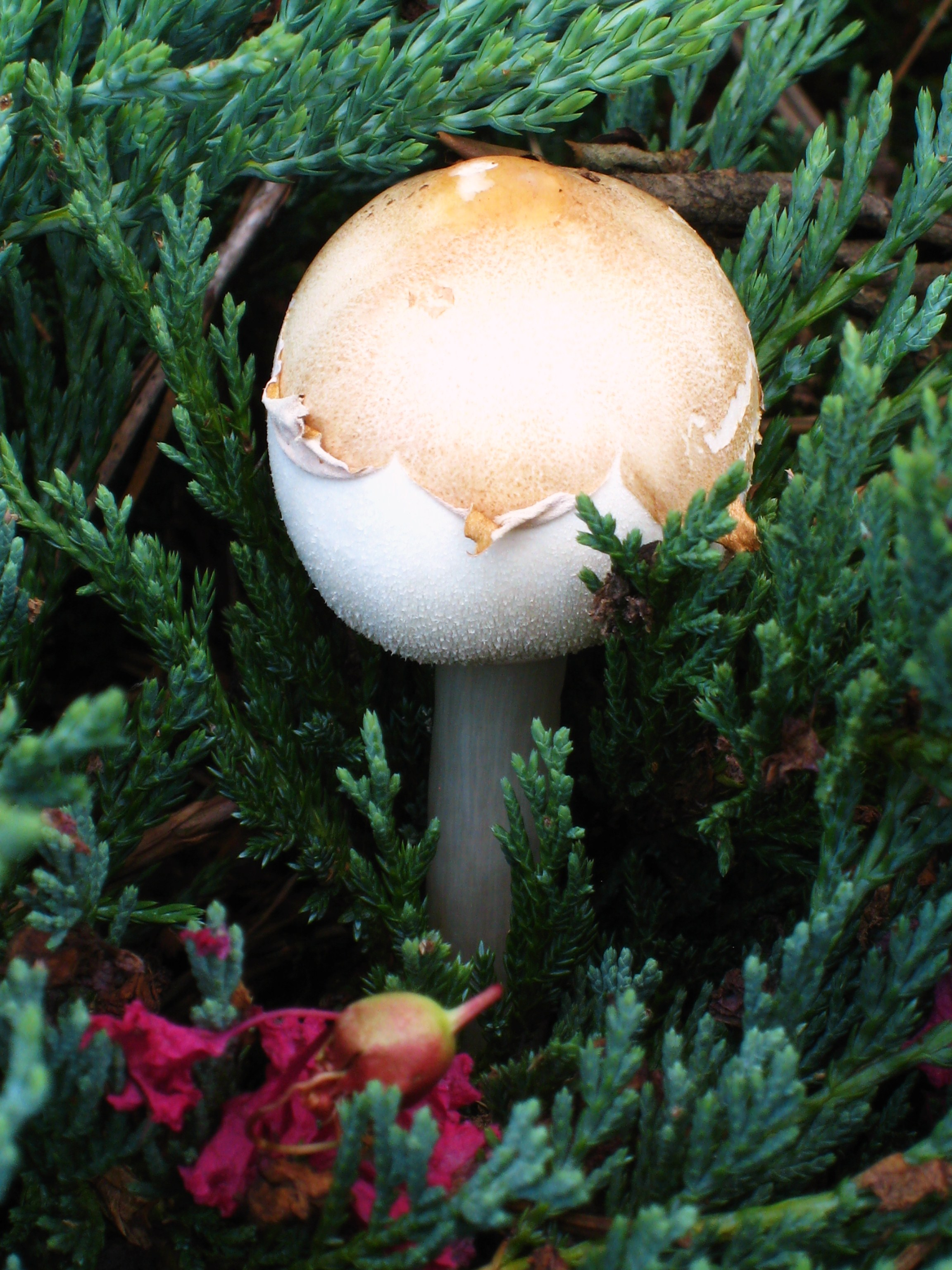
Young specimen of Chlorohyllum molybdites

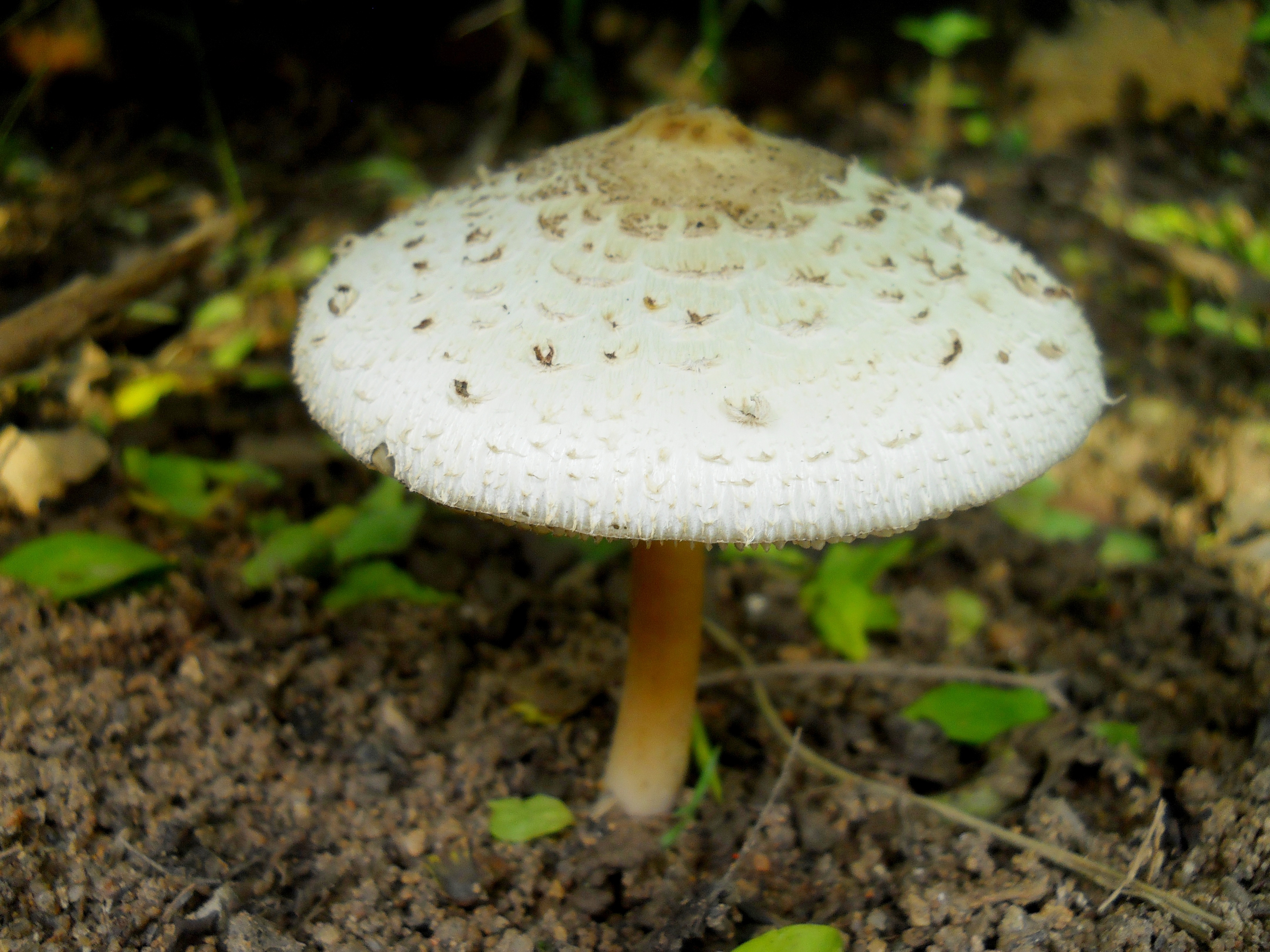
Chlorophyllum molybdites in Ranchi, India

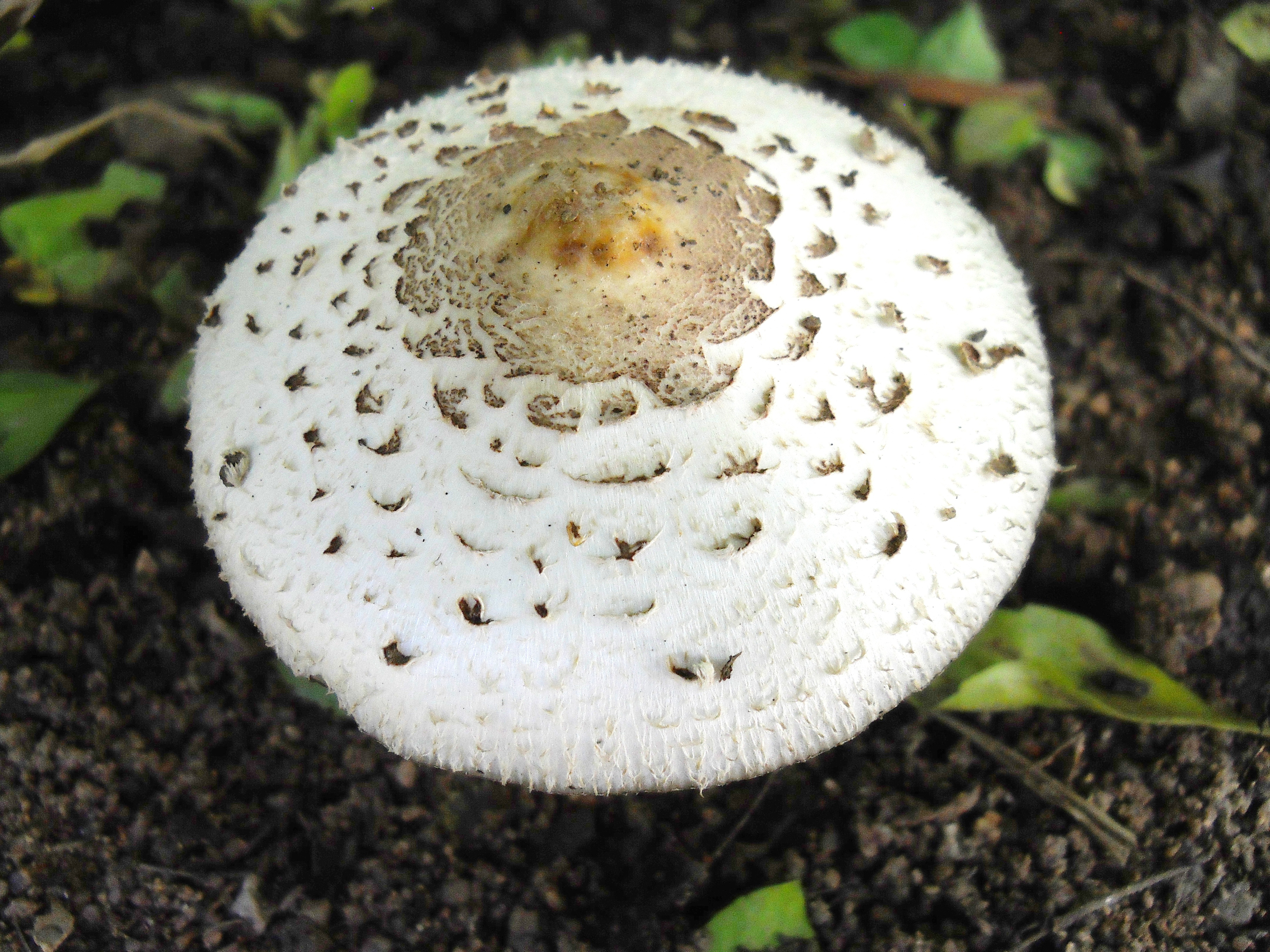
Chlorophyllum molybdites in Ranchi, India

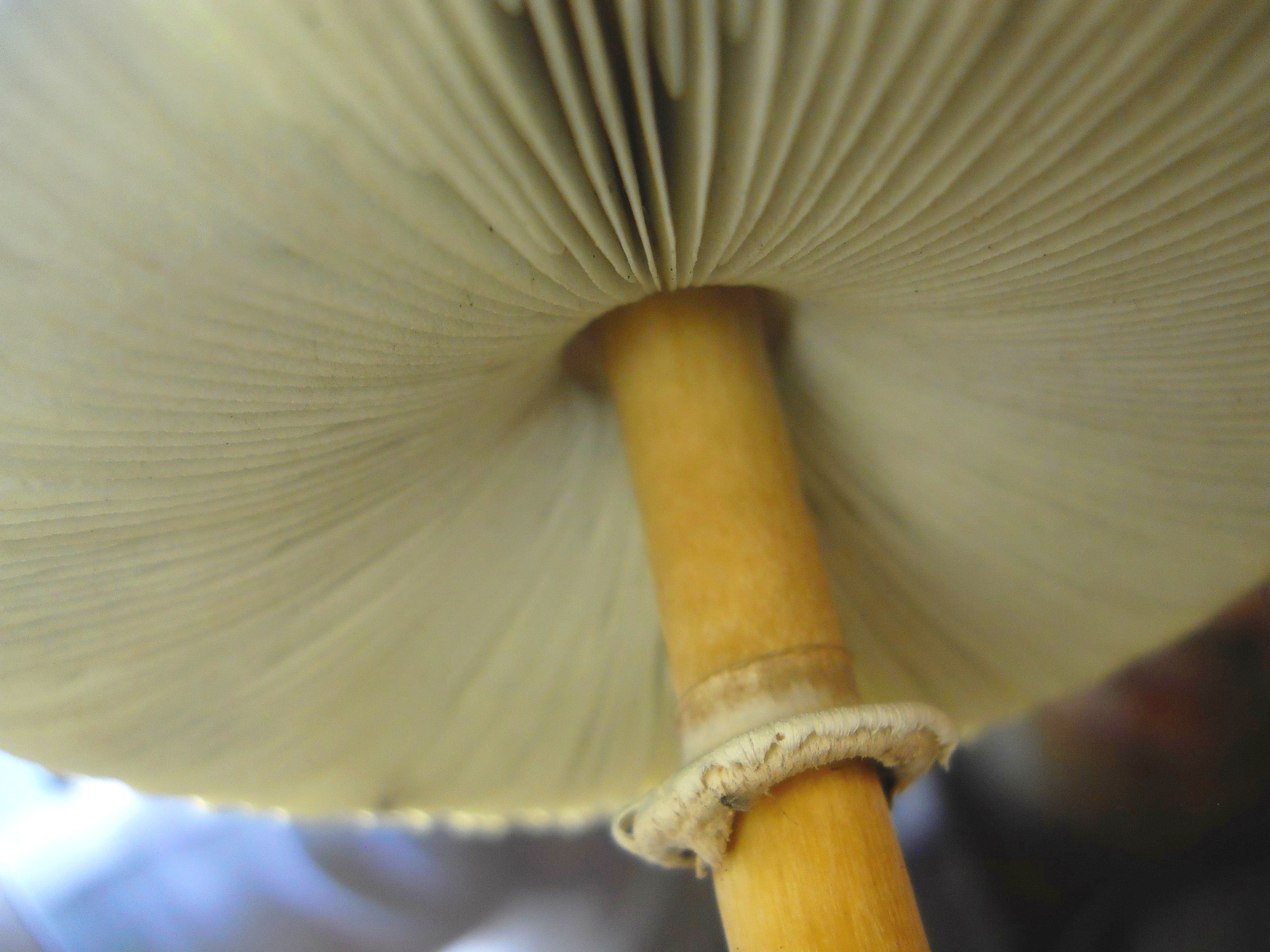
Chlorophyllum molybdites underside of the cap

== List of species ==
As of July 2019, the nomenclatural database Index Fungorum lists 28 species in the genus.

- C. abruptibulbum
- C. africanum
- C. agaricoides
- C. alborubescens
- C. arizonicum
- C. bharatense
- C. brunneum
- C. demangei
- C. globosum
- C. hortense
- C. humei
- C. levantinum
- C. lusitanicum
- C. madagascariense
- C. mammillatum
- C. molybdites
- C. morganii
- C. neomastoideum
- C. nothorachodes
- C. olivieri
- C. paleotropicum
- C. pseudoglobosum
- C. rhacodes
- C. shimogaense
- C. sphaerosporum
- C. subfulvidiscum
- C. subrhacodes
- C. venenatum

== See also ==
- Endoptychum
