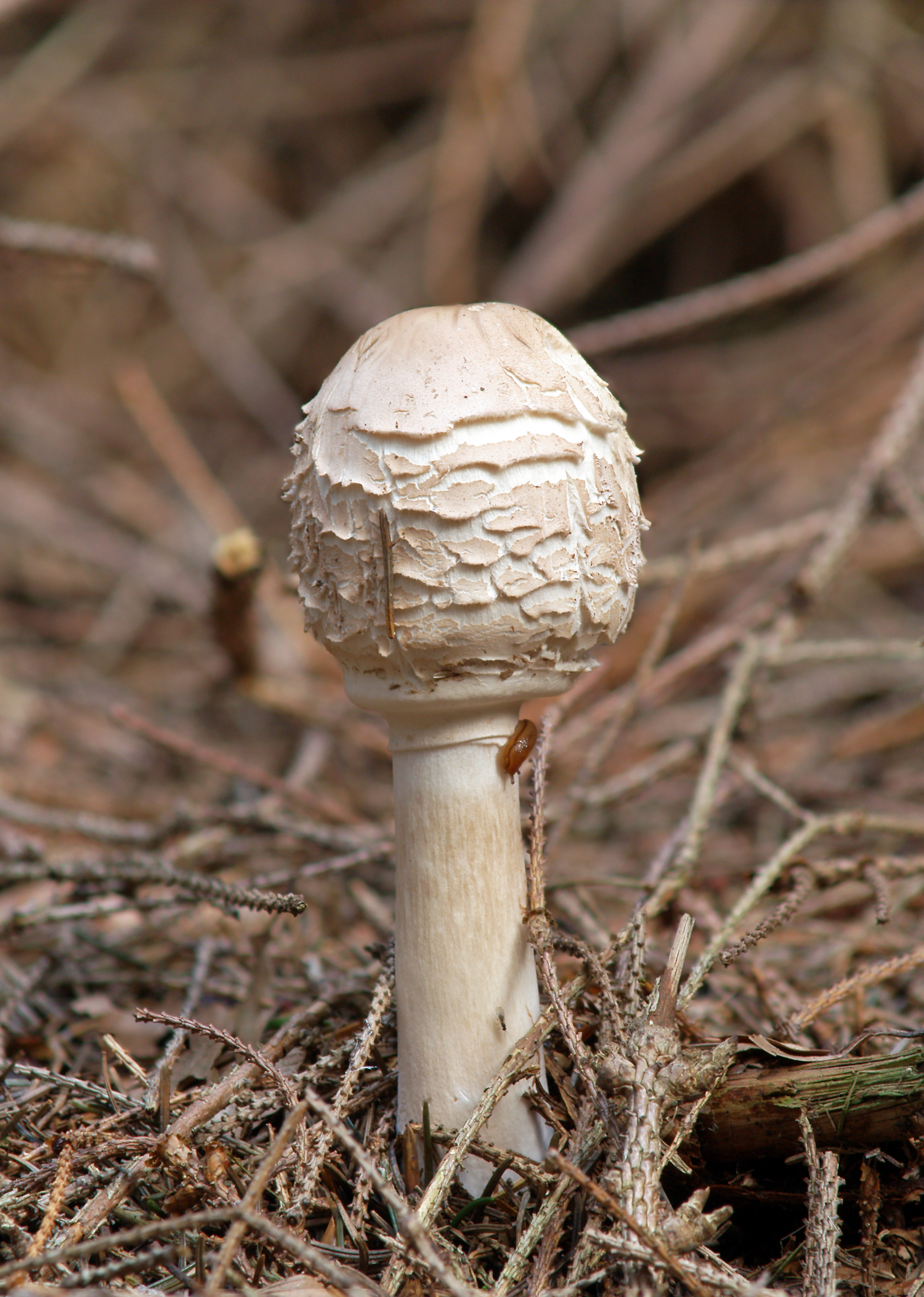
- Chlorophyllum rhacodes

Scientific classification
- Kingdom: Fungi
- Division: Basidiomycota
- Class: Agaricomycetes
- Order: Agaricales
- Family: Agaricaceae
- Genus: Chlorophyllum
- Species complex: Chlorophyllum rhacodes complex

= Shaggy parasol =

Shaggy parasol
- Mycological characteristics
- Gills on hymenium
- Cap is umbonate or convex
- Hymenium is free
- Stipe has a ring
- Spore print is white
- Ecology is saprotrophic
- Edibility is choice but not recommended

Shaggy parasol is the common name for three closely related species of mushroom: Chlorophyllum rhacodes, C. olivieri and C. brunneum, found in North America, Europe and Southern Africa. C. brunneum is also found in Australia.

== Taxonomy ==
Chlorophyllum rhacodes, C. olivieri and C. brunneum were formerly known as Macrolepiota rhacodes or Lepiota rhacodes, but the name was changed on the basis of molecular phylogenetic evidence demonstrating a closer relationship to Chlorophyllum molybdites than to Macrolepiota procera. The subspecies Macrolepiota rhacodes var. brunneum was also elevated to species status as Chlorophyllum brunneum. Chlorophyllum olivieri is a closely related species that is also eaten as the "Shaggy Parasol".

Many reference works spell the epithet "rachodes" rather than "rhacodes". The spelling "rachodes" was used by Vittadini when he first published the species in 1835, but was erroneous as the Greek word rhakos 'piece of cloth' should be transcribed as rhacos. Index Fungorum keeps to the original author's spelling, "rachodes".

== Description ==
The shaggy parasol is a large and conspicuous agaric, with thick brown scales and protuberances on its fleshy white cap. The gills and spore print are both white in colour. Its stipe is slender, but bulbous at the base, is coloured uniformly and bears no patterns. It is fleshy, and a reddish, or maroon discoloration occurs and a pungent odour is evolved when it is cut. The egg-shaped caps become wider and flatter as they mature.

In all three species, the cap reaches about 6 to 20 centimetres (2 1/4 to 7 3/4 in) in width and the stipe grows to 5 to 20 cm (2 to 8 in) tall with a diameter up to 2 to 3 cm.

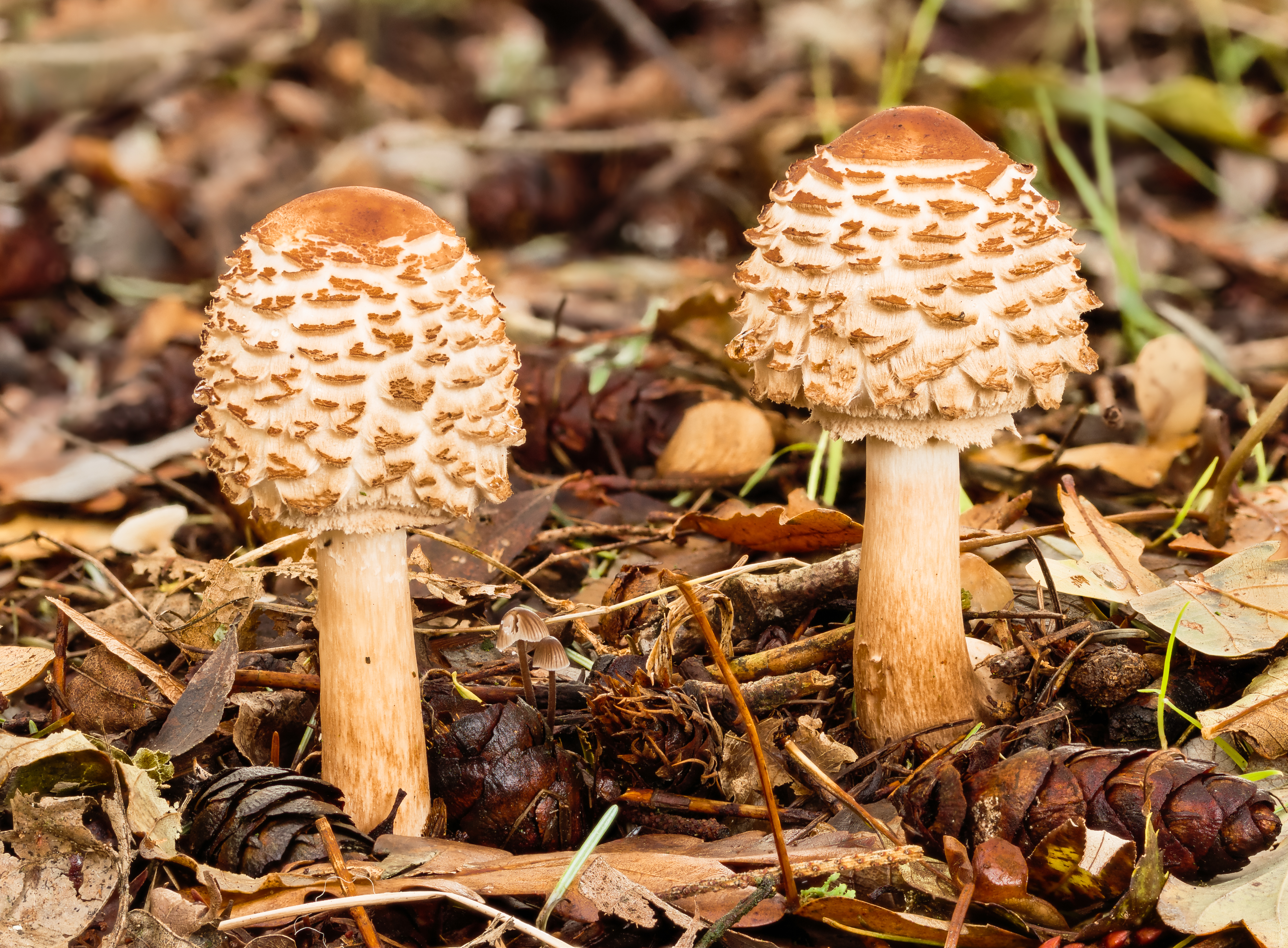
Two young tuberous C. rhacodes

Adult C. rhacodes cap

=== Similar species ===
The shaggy parasol is similar in appearance to the similarly edible parasol mushroom, Macrolepiota procera. The latter grows considerably larger however, and is more likely to be found in the open than C. rhacodes, which prefers more shade and dislikes open pastures and fields. Another distinguishing feature is that C. rhacodes lacks the brown bands that are on the stem of M. procera.

== Edibility ==
The shaggy parasol is popularly praised as an edible mushroom. However, it contains toxins which can cause gastric upsets and some individuals show a strong allergic response to all Chlorophyllum species, including shaggy parasols.

While Chlorophyllum rhacodes and C. olivieri are considered edible everywhere, C. brunneum is considered toxic in some European countries as it causes severe gastric upset, although no specific toxin has been identified.

Furthermore, young shaggy parasols look identical to the poisonous Chlorophyllum molybdites (the mushroom that causes the most poisonings in North America yearly). Checking for a white spore print is essential as C. molybdites' print is green (older specimens having slightly green gills). As a result, this mushroom is not recommended for inexperienced hunters.
