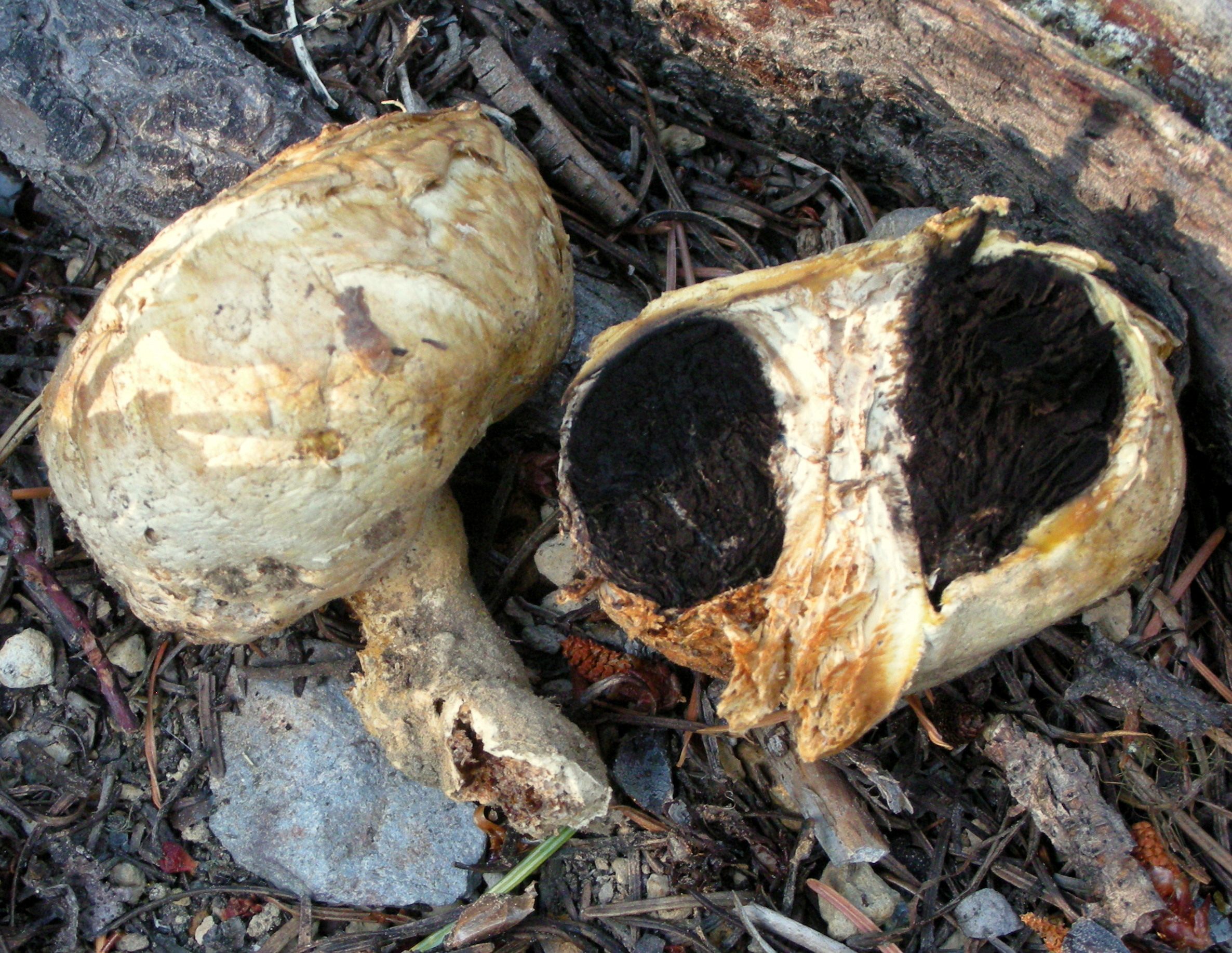

Scientific classification
- Kingdom: Fungi
- Division: Basidiomycota
- Class: Agaricomycetes
- Order: Agaricales
- Family: Agaricaceae
- Genus: Agaricus
- Species: A. inapertus

Binomial name
- Agaricus inapertus Vellinga (2003)

Synonyms
- Endoptychum depressum Singer & A.H.Sm. (1958)

= Agaricus inapertus =

Species of fungus

Agaricus inapertus
- Mycological characteristics
- Glebal hymenium
- Cap is convex
- Hymenium attachment is not applicable
- Stipe is bare
- Spore print is purple-black
- Ecology is saprotrophic
- Edibility is unknown

Agaricus inapertus, commonly known as the mountain gasteroid agaricus, is a species of secotioid fungus in the genus Agaricus. It was first described by American mycologists Rolf Singer and Alexander H. Smith in 1958 as Endoptychum depressum. Molecular analysis later proved it to be aligned with Agaricus, and it was formally transferred in a 2003 publication.

The cap grows up to 15 centimetres (6 in) wide. It is whitish, staining yellowish. A veil joins the cap margin to the stem, which is up to about 4 cm long. The flesh is whitish and toughens in age. The spores are contained on rudimentary gills, initially appearing pallid then brown. A spore print is unobtainable. It is related to species in Agaricus sect. Arvenses.

The species grows with conifers in western North America. Firm specimens have been said to be edible.

== See also ==
- List of Agaricus species
