= Vassilii Czernajew =

Russian botanist

Vasiliǐ Czernajew
- Василий Черняев
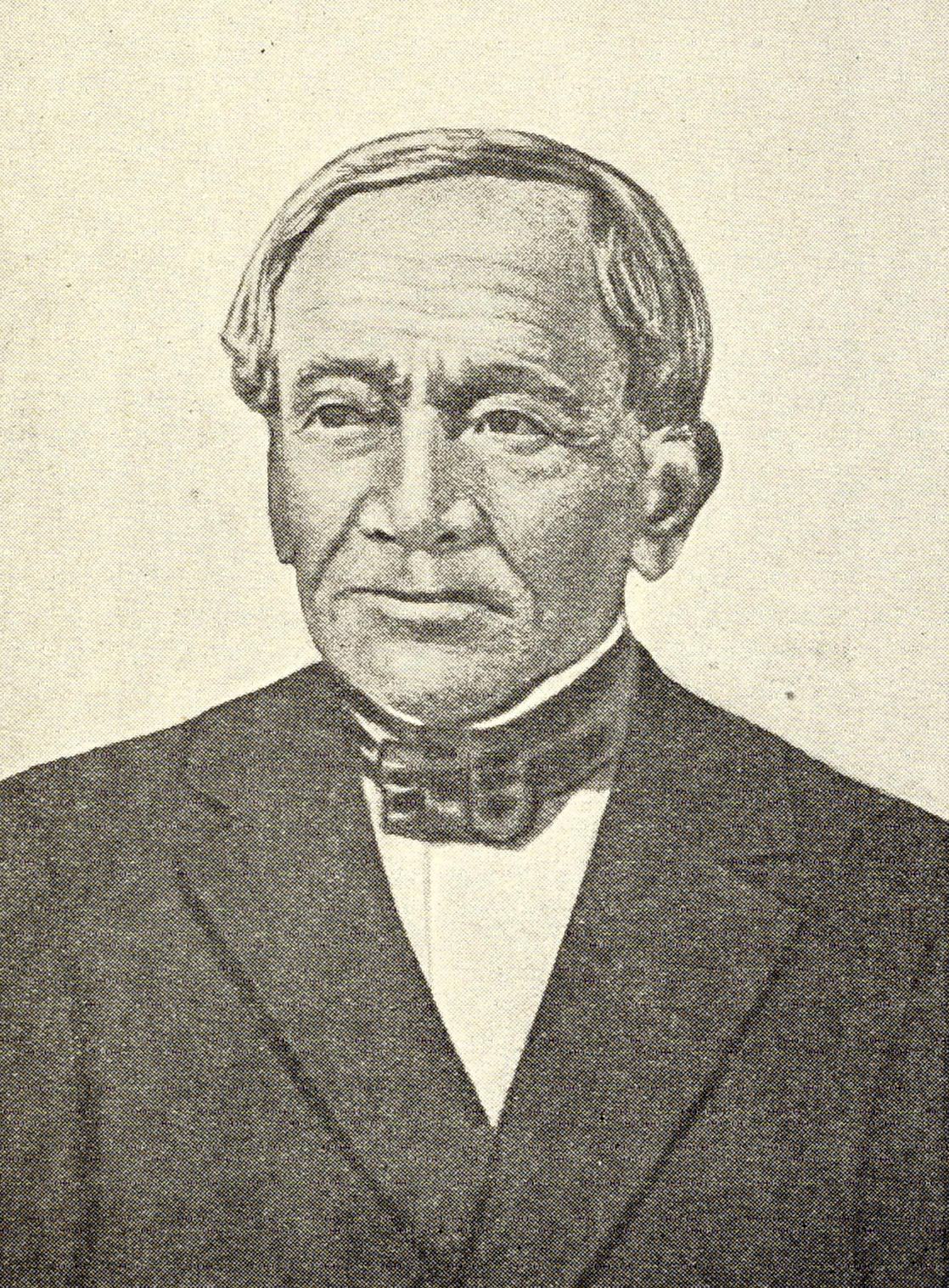
- Portrait of the botanist V. M. Czernajew
- Born: 2 April 1794; Zemlyansky Uyezd, Russian Empire
- Died: 6 March 1871 (aged 76); Kharkiv, Russian Empire
- Education: National University of Kharkiv
- Children: 1
- Scientific career
- Fields: Biology; Botany; Zoology; Mycology
- Workplaces: National University of Kharkiv
- Author abbrev. (zoology): Czern.

Vasiliǐ Matveievitch Czernajew (Russian: Василий Матвеевич Черняев; April 2, 1794 – March 6, 1871) was a Russian botanist responsible for collecting and describing at least five new genera and nine new species of fungi between 1822 and 1839. His name is written in the Cyrillic alphabet and has appeared in scientific documentation with a number of different romanizations, including V. Czernajev, Basil Matveievich Czerniaiev, B.M. Czernaiev, B.M. Czernjaëv, B.M. Czernjaëw, V.M. Tschernaiew, V. Tschernajef, and V. Czerniaier, although the official abbreviation seems to be consistently written as Czern.

== Career ==
Czernajew was a botany professor at the University of Kharkiv and the director of the botanical garden there.

== See also ==
- Category:Taxa named by Vassilii Czernajew

== Bibliography ==
- "Nouveaux cryptogames de l'Ukraine et quelques mots sur la flore de ce pays" [New cryptogams of Ukraine and a few words about the flora of this country]. Bulletin de la Société impériale des naturalistes de Moscou (in French). 18 (2): 132–157. 1845. OCLC 79713598 – via Biodiversity Heritage Library.
