= List of Leucocoprinus species =

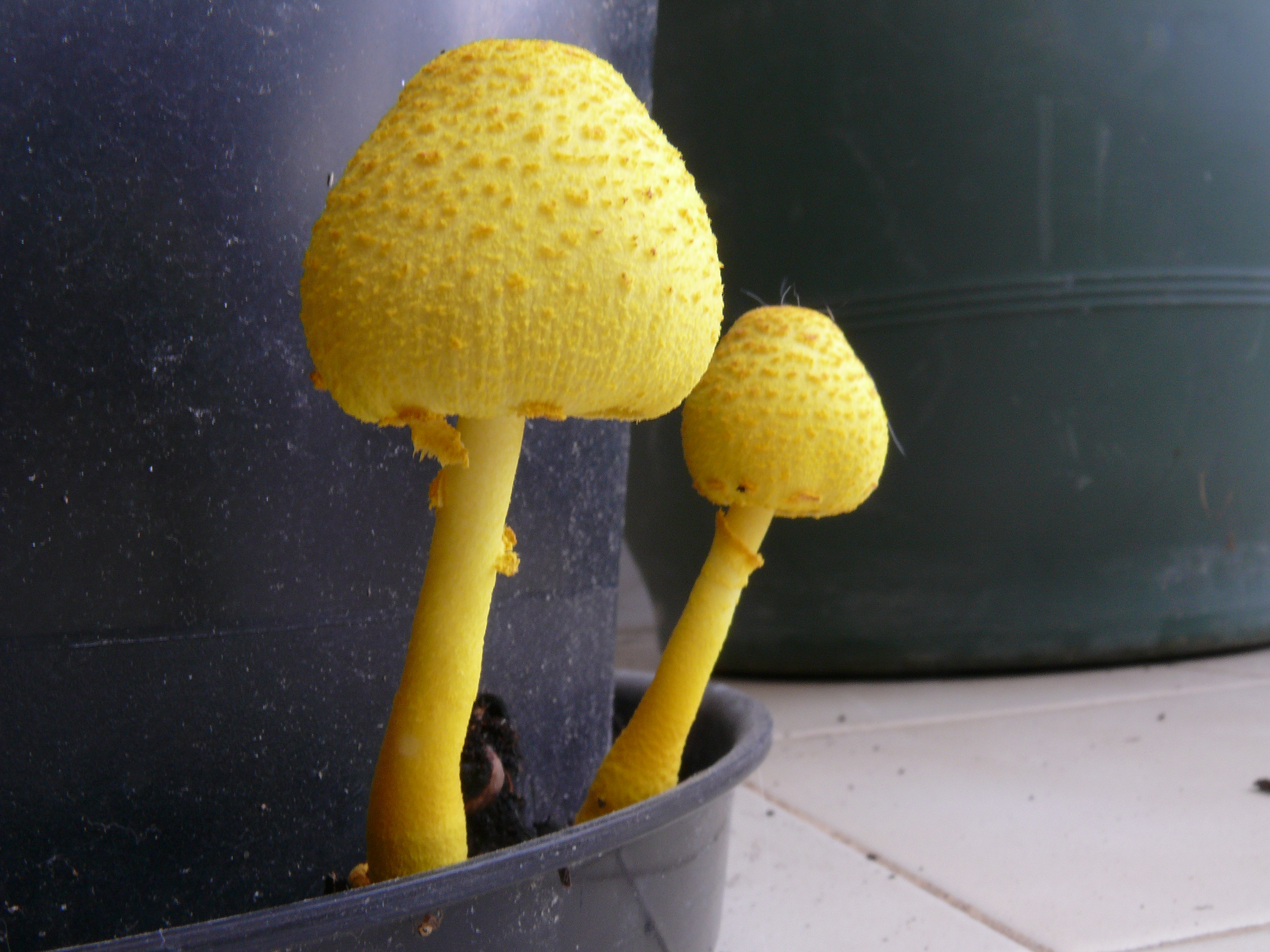
Leucocoprinus birnbaumii growing from a plant pot

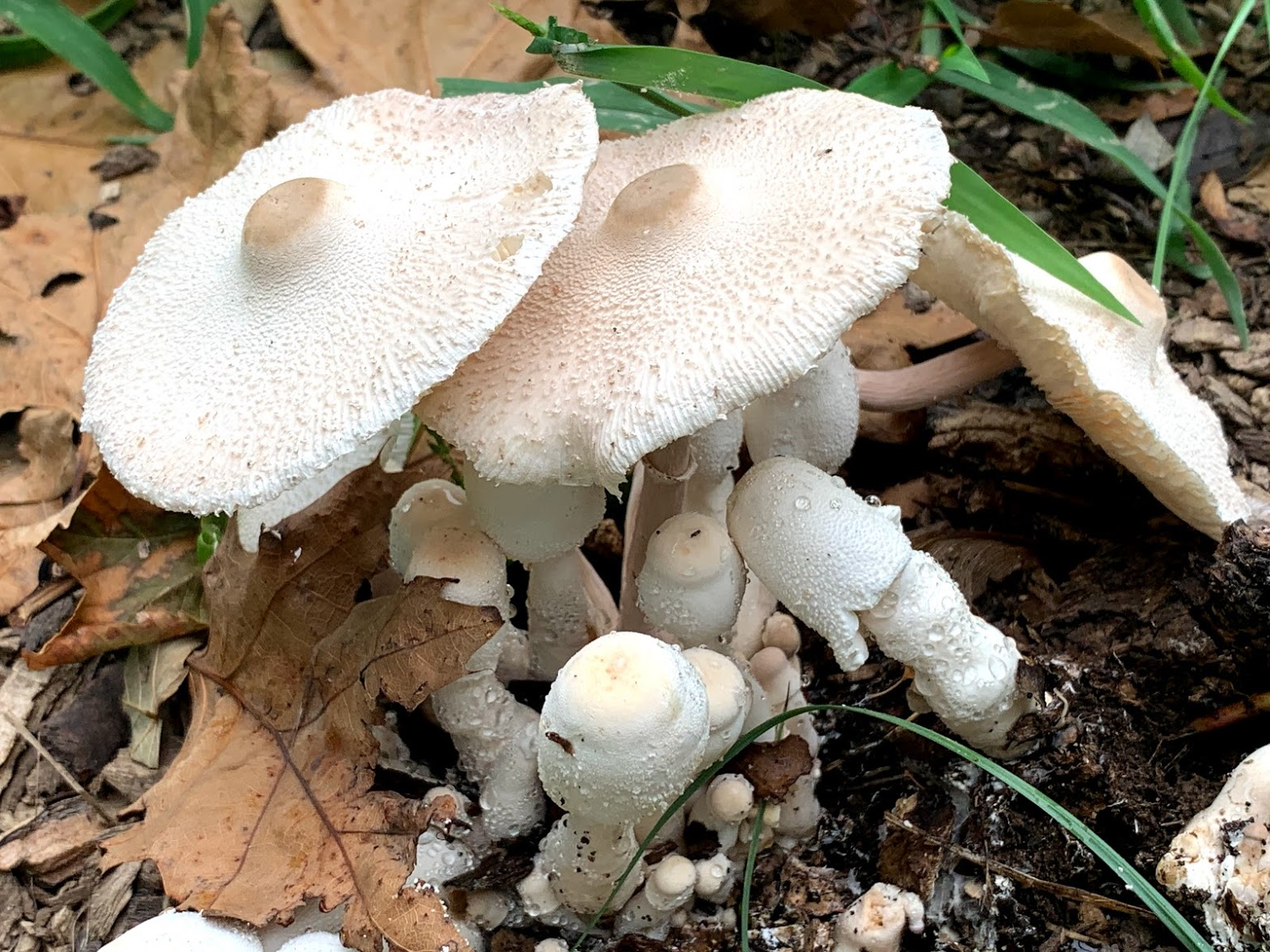
Leucocoprinus cepistipes

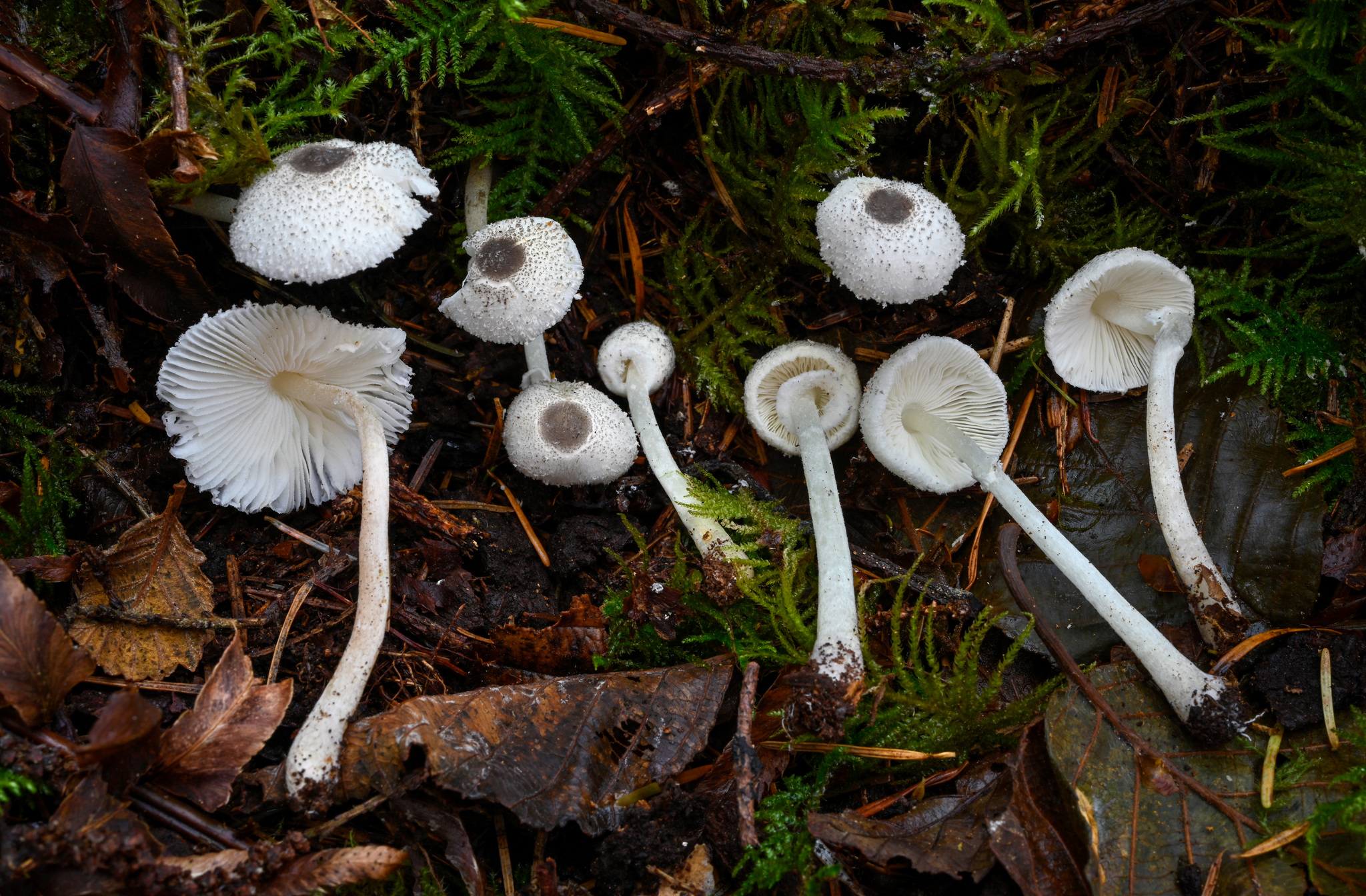
Leucocoprinus brebissonii

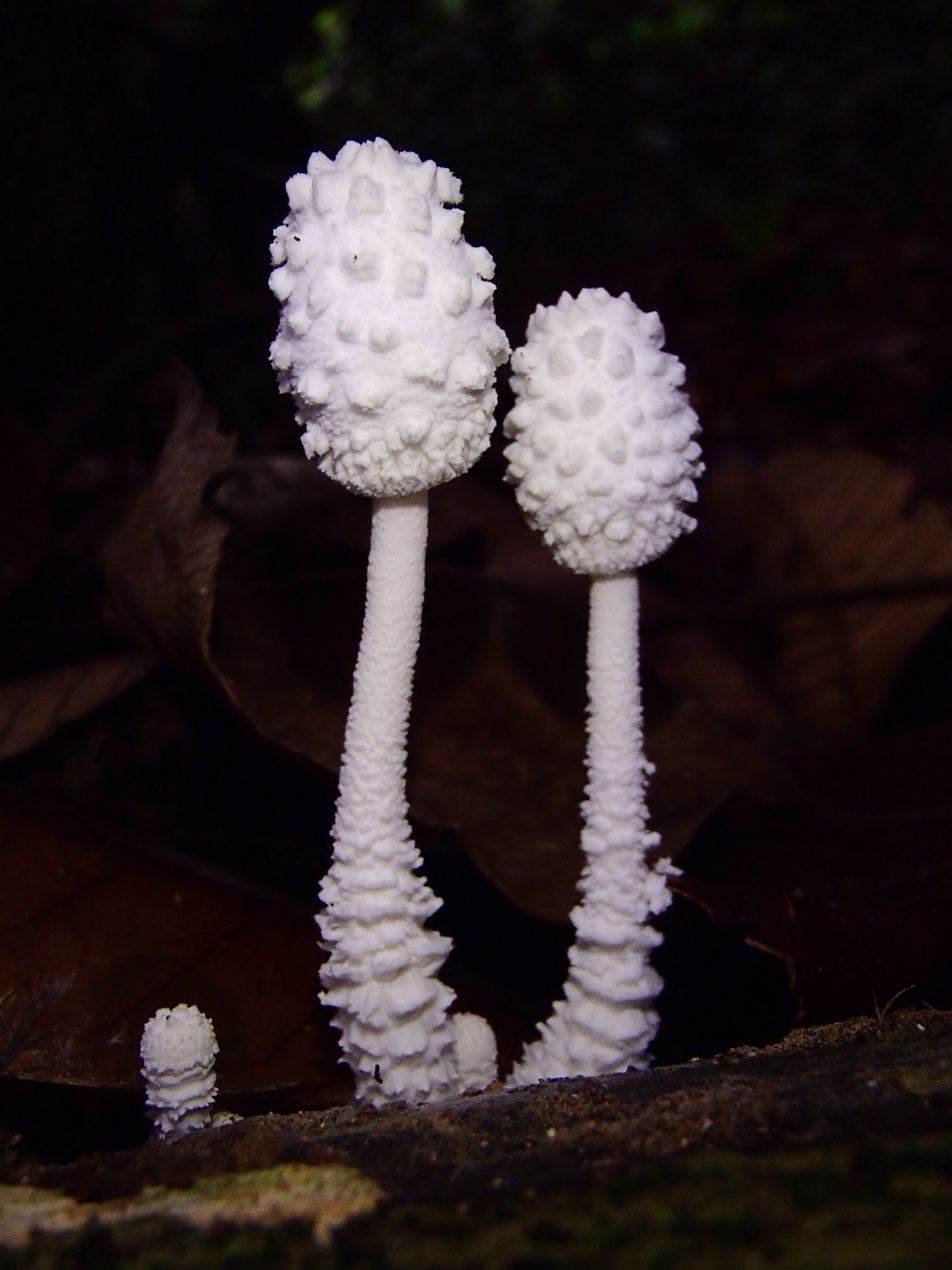
Immature Leucocoprinus cretaceus

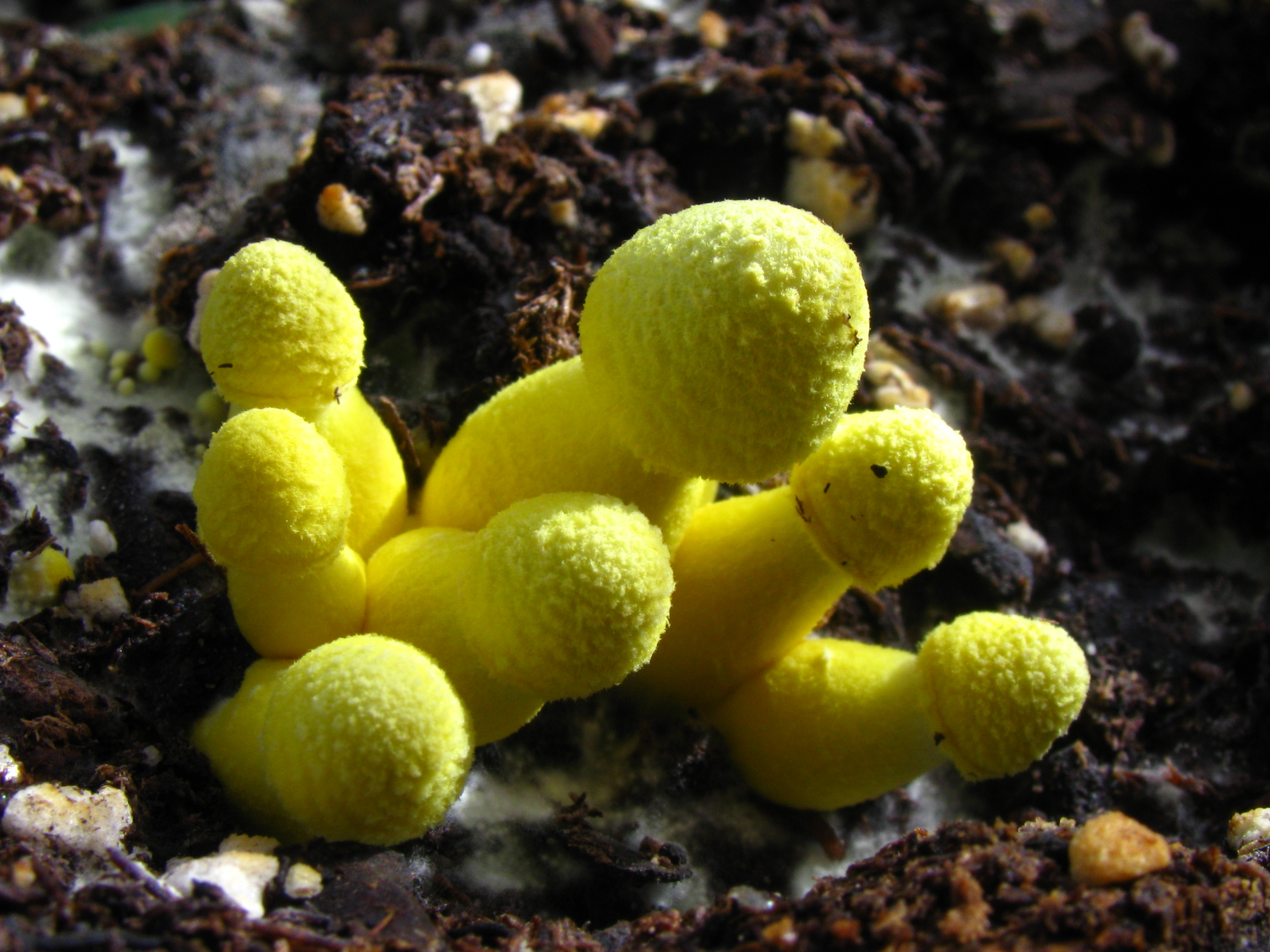
Immature Leucocoprinus birnbaumii

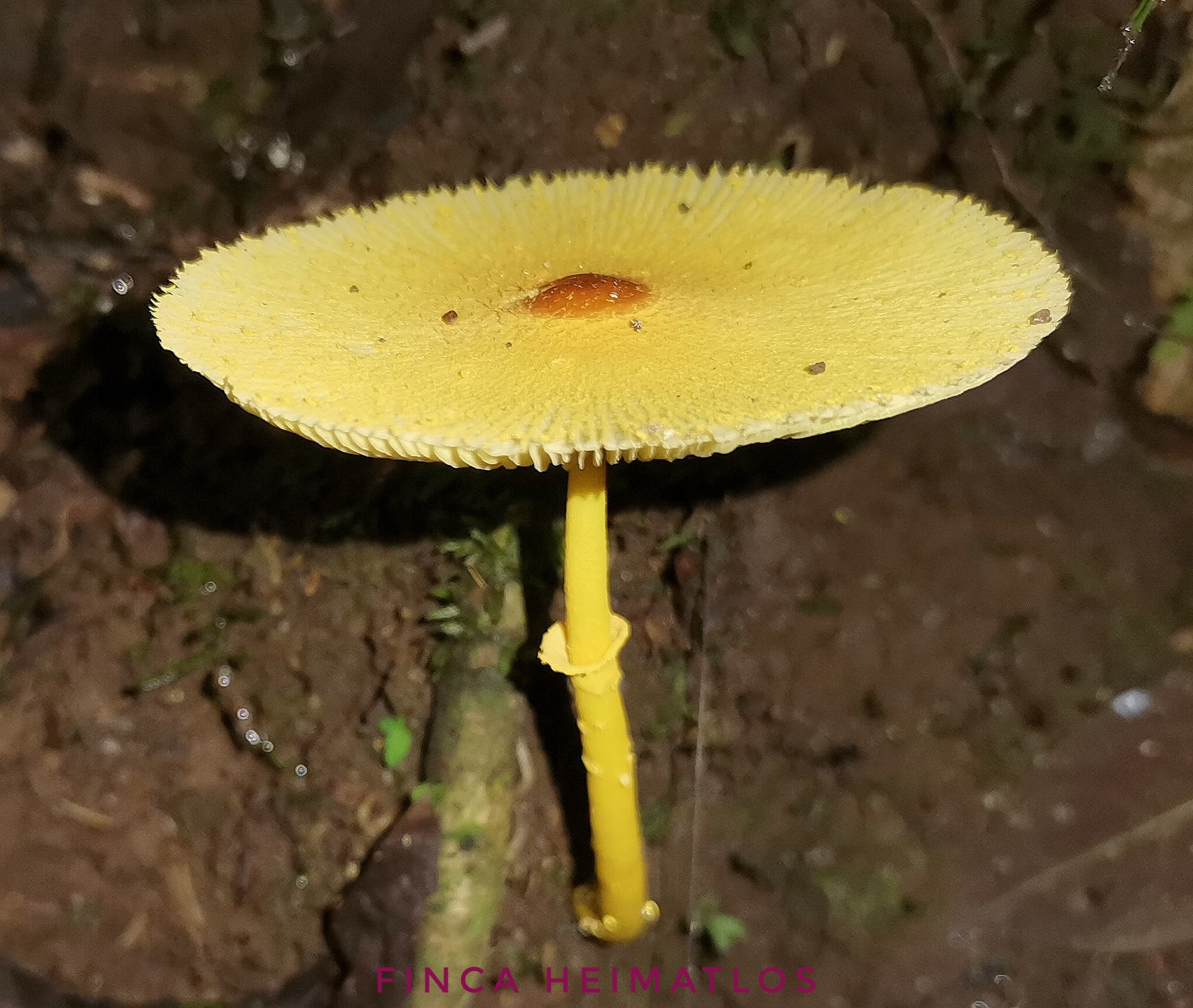
Leucocoprinus brunneoluteus

This is a list of species in the agaric genus Leucocoprinus.

== Species ==
As of October 2022, Species Fungorum and Mycobank contained just under 100 recognised species of Leucocoprinus in total however following a series of reclassifications in 2023 and 2024 which transferred many Leucoagaricus species into the Leucocoprinus genus this number increased to just under 250 species as of January 2026.

Many of the species described are not well known and not often recorded and some may be described based on a single recorded observation and a decades' old deposited specimen which may be subject to future reclassification.

1. Leucocoprinus acer Raithelh. (1988)
2. Leucocoprinus acutoumbonatus T.K.A. Kumar & Manim. (2009)
3. Leucocoprinus adelphicus (Vellinga) Redhead (2023)
4. Leucocoprinus albosquamosus (Y.R. Ma, Z.W. Ge & T.Z. Liu) M. Asif, Saba & Vellinga (2024)
5. Leucocoprinus amanitoides (R.M. Davis & Vellinga) Kun L. Yang, Jia Y. Lin & Zhu L. Yang (2024)
6. Leucocoprinus amazonicus (A. Ortiz & Franco-Mol.) Kun L. Yang, Jia Y. Lin & Zhu L. Yang (2024)
7. Leucocoprinus ammovirescens (Bon) Kun L. Yang, Jia Y. Lin & Zhu L. Yang (2024)
8. Leucocoprinus amylosporus (Malençon) Migl. & Donato (2024)
9. Leucocoprinus antillarum Justo, Bizzi & Angelini (2021)
10. Leucocoprinus ariminensis (Dovana, Angeli, Contu & Brandi) M. Asif, Saba & Vellinga (2024)
11. Leucocoprinus armeniacoflavus E. Ludw. (2012)
12. Leucocoprinus asiaticus (Qasim, Nawaz & Khalid) M. Asif, Saba & Vellinga (2024)
13. Leucocoprinus atroazureus (Jun F. Liang, Zhu L. Yang & J. Xu) M. Asif, Saba & Vellinga (2024)
14. Leucocoprinus atroferrugineus Ishaq, Fiaz & Khalid (2025)
15. Leucocoprinus atroviridis (Y.R. Ma, Z.W. Ge & T.Z. Liu) M. Asif, Saba & Vellinga (2024)
16. Leucocoprinus attinorum S. Urrea-Valencia, A. Rodrigues & R.J. Bizarria (2023)
17. Leucocoprinus aurantioruber (Y.R. Ma, Z.W. Ge & T.Z. Liu) M. Asif, Saba & Vellinga (2024)
18. Leucocoprinus aurantiovergens (A. Gennari & Migl.) Migl. & Donato (2024)
19. Leucocoprinus aureofloccosus (Henn.) Bon (1981)
20. Leucocoprinus austrofragilis Aberdeen (1992)
21. Leucocoprinus badhamii (Berk. & Broome) Locq. (1943)
22. Leucocoprinus badius (S. Hussain, Pfister, Afshan & Khalid) M. Asif, Saba & Vellinga (2024)
23. Leucocoprinus bakeri (Dennis) Singer (1982)
24. Leucocoprinus barssii (Zeller) Migl. & Donato (2024)
25. Leucocoprinus beelianus Heinem. (1977)
26. Leucocoprinus beijingensis R.L. Zhao & J.X. Li (2025)
27. Leucocoprinus biornatus (Berk. & Broome) Locq. (1945)
28. Leucocoprinus birnbaumii (Corda) Singer (1962)
29. Leucocoprinus bohusii Wasser (1975)
30. Leucocoprinus bonianus (Pat.) Zhu L. Yang (2000)
31. Leucocoprinus bonii (A. Caball.) Kun L. Yang, Jia Y. Lin & Zhu L. Yang (2024)
32. Leucocoprinus brebissonii (Godey) Locq. (1943)
33. Leucocoprinus breviramus H.V. Sm. & N.S. Weber (1982)
34. Leucocoprinus brunneocanus (Fei Yu, Jun F. Liang & Z.W. Ge) M. Asif, Saba & Vellinga (2024)
35. Leucocoprinus brunneocingulatus (P.D. Orton) Migl. & Donato (2024)
36. Leucocoprinus brunneodiscus (A.K. Dutta & K. Acharya) Kun L. Yang, Jia Y. Lin & Zhu L. Yang (2024)
37. Leucocoprinus brunneoluteus Capelari & L.J. Gimenes (2004)
38. Leucocoprinus brunneoruber (J.M. Zhang & X.T. Zhu) R.L. Zhao & J.X. Li (2025)
39. Leucocoprinus brunneosporus B.E. Lechner & J.M. Suárez (2021)
40. Leucocoprinus brunneotegulis Dähncke, Contu & Vizzini (2011)
41. Leucocoprinus brunnescens (Peck) Pegler (1983)
42. Leucocoprinus brunneus (Zia Ullah, Jabeen & Khalid) M. Asif, Saba & Vellinga (2024)
43. Leucocoprinus bulbiger (Justo, Bizzi & Angelini) M. Asif, Saba & Vellinga (2024)
44. Leucocoprinus bulbipes (Mont.) Raithelh. (1987)
45. Leucocoprinus caeruleovertens (Justo, Bizzi & Angelini) M. Asif, Saba & Vellinga (2024)
46. Leucocoprinus callainitinctus (K.P.D. Latha, K.N.A. Raj & Manim) M. Asif, Saba & Vellinga (2024)
47. Leucocoprinus canariensis P. Mohr & Dähncke (2004)
48. Leucocoprinus candidus (Y.R. Ma, Z.W. Ge & T.Z. Liu) M. Asif & Saba (2024)
49. Leucocoprinus carphophyllus (Berk. & Broome) Kun L. Yang, Jia Y. Lin & Zhu L. Yang (2024)
50. Leucocoprinus castroi Blanco-Dios (2003)
51. Leucocoprinus centricastaneus (Y.R. Ma, Z.W. Ge & T.Z. Liu) M. Asif, Saba & Vellinga (2024)
52. Leucocoprinus cepistipes (Sowerby) Pat. (1889)
53. Leucocoprinus changamangaensis (Hajra & Niazi) M. Asif, Saba & Vellinga (2024)
54. Leucocoprinus chryseus Wichanský (1963)
55. Leucocoprinus cinerascens (Quél.) Locq. (1945)
56. Leucocoprinus cinereopallidus (Contu) Migl. & Donato (2024)
57. Leucocoprinus cinereoradicatus (Boisselet & Migl.) Migl. & Donato (2024)
58. Leucocoprinus cinnamomeodiscus Asif, Saba & Raza (2023)
59. Leucocoprinus citrinellus (Speg.) Raithelh. (1987)
60. Leucocoprinus coerulescens (Peck) Kun L. Yang, Jia Y. Lin & Zhu L. Yang (2024)
61. Leucocoprinus cretaceus (Bull.) Locq. (1945)
62. Leucocoprinus cristatulus (Rick) Raithelh. (1987)
63. Leucocoprinus croceobasis (G. MuÃ±oz, A. Caball., Contu & Vizzini) M. Asif, Saba & Vellinga (2024)
64. Leucocoprinus croceovelutinus Bon & Boiffard (1972)
65. Leucocoprinus crystallifer (Vellinga) Migl. & Donato (2024)
66. Leucocoprinus cupresseoides (Migl. & Forin) Migl. & Donato (2024)
67. Leucocoprinus cupresseus (Burl.) M. Asif, Saba & Vellinga (2024)
68. Leucocoprinus cyanescens (Corriol & Chalange) Kun L. Yang, Jia Y. Lin & Zhu L. Yang (2024)
69. Leucocoprinus cygneus (J.E. Lange) Bon (1978)
70. Leucocoprinus dacrytus (Vellinga) Kun L. Yang, Jia Y. Lin & Zhu L. Yang (2024)
71. Leucocoprinus dahranwalanus Asif, Saba & Raza (2023)
72. Leucocoprinus deceptivus (Grilli) Migl. & Donato (2024)
73. Leucocoprinus decipiens (Contu, Vizzini & Vellinga) M. Asif, Saba & Vellinga (2024)
74. Leucocoprinus delicatulus T.K.A. Kumar & Manim. (2009)
75. Leucocoprinus digitatocystis R.L. Zhao & J.X. Li (2025)
76. Leucocoprinus discoideus (Beeli) Heinem. (1977)
77. Leucocoprinus domingensis Justo, Bizzi, Angelini & Vizzini (2020)
78. Leucocoprinus dunensis S. Urrea-Valencia, A. Rodrigues & R.J. Bizarria (2023)
79. Leucocoprinus dyscritus (Vellinga) M. Asif, Saba & Vellinga (2024)
80. Leucocoprinus elaeidis (Beeli) Heinem. (1977)
81. Leucocoprinus eriodermus (Malençon) Migl. & Donato (2024)
82. Leucocoprinus erminiae (Consiglio, Setti & Vizzini) Kun L. Yang, Jia Y. Lin & Zhu L. Yang (2024)
83. Leucocoprinus erythrophaeus (Vellinga) Redhead (2023)
84. Leucocoprinus fibrillosus Raithelh. (1988)
85. Leucocoprinus flammeotinctoides (Vellinga) Redhead (2023)
86. Leucocoprinus flammeotinctus (Kauffman) Redhead (2023)
87. Leucocoprinus flavescens (Morgan) H.V. Sm. (1981)
88. Leucocoprinus flavoaurantiacus M. Ishaq, Fiaz & Khalid (2024)
89. Leucocoprinus flavovirens (Jun F. Liang, Zhu L. Yang & J. Xu) Kun L. Yang, Jia Y. Lin & Zhu L. Yang (2024)
90. Leucocoprinus flavus (Beeli) Heinem. (1977)
91. Leucocoprinus flos-sulphuris (Schnizl.) Cejp (1948)
92. Leucocoprinus fragilis (M. Asif, Niazi, Izhar & Khalid) M. Asif, Saba & Vellinga (2024)
93. Leucocoprinus fragilissimus (Ravenel ex Berk. & M.A. Curtis) Pat. (1900)
94. Leucocoprinus fuligineodiffractus (Bellù & Lanzoni) Migl. & Donato (2024)
95. Leucocoprinus fuligineopunctatus Justo, Bizzi & Angelini (2021)
96. Leucocoprinus furfuraceipes (Han C. Wang & Zhu L. Yang) Kun L. Yang, Jia Y. Lin & Zhu L. Yang (2024)
97. Leucocoprinus fuscatus Pegler (1977)
98. Leucocoprinus gaillardii (Bon & Boiffard) M. Asif, Saba & Vellinga (2024)
99. Leucocoprinus gandour Har. & Pat. (1909)
100. Leucocoprinus gauguei (Bon & Boiffard) Migl. & Donato (2024)
101. Leucocoprinus georginae (W.G. Sm.) M. Asif, Saba & Vellinga (2024)
102. Leucocoprinus glareicolor (S. Ashraf, Naseer & Khalid) M. Asif, Saba & Vellinga (2024)
103. Leucocoprinus gongylophorus (Möller) R. Heim (1957)
104. Leucocoprinus griseodiscus (Bon) Migl. & Donato (2024)
105. Leucocoprinus griseofloccosus Lagardère & Eyssart. (2018)
106. Leucocoprinus griseosquamosus (Sysouph. & Thongkl.) Kun L. Yang, Jia Y. Lin & Zhu L. Yang (2024)
107. Leucocoprinus guatopoensis (W.F. Chiu) M. Asif, Saba & Vellinga (2024)
108. Leucocoprinus gujratensis (A. Rehman, Usman, Afshan & Khalid) M. Asif, Saba & Vellinga (2024)
109. Leucocoprinus heinemannii Migl. (1987)
110. Leucocoprinus hesperius (Vellinga) M. Asif, Saba & Vellinga (2024)
111. Leucocoprinus houaynhangensis (Sysouph.) Kun L. Yang, Jia Y. Lin & Zhu L. Yang (2024)
112. Leucocoprinus ianthinus (Sacc.) P. Mohr (1994)
113. Leucocoprinus idae fragum (Guinb., Boisselet & G. Dupuy) M. Asif, Saba & Vellinga (2024)
114. Leucocoprinus imerinensis Bouriquet (1942)
115. Leucocoprinus inflatus Raithelh. (1987)
116. Leucocoprinus infuscatus (Vellinga) Kun L. Yang, Jia Y. Lin & Zhu L. Yang (2024)
117. Leucocoprinus ionidicolor (Bellù & Lanzoni) Migl. & Donato (2024)
118. Leucocoprinus irinellus (Chalange) Kun L. Yang, Jia Y. Lin & Zhu L. Yang (2024)
119. Leucocoprinus japonicus (Kawam. ex Hongo) S. Ito (1959)
120. Leucocoprinus jubilaei (Joss.) Wasser (1976)
121. Leucocoprinus karjaticus (P.B. Patil, N.P. Patil, S. Chahar & S. Maurya) R.L. Zhao & J.X. Li (2025)
122. Leucocoprinus lacrymans T.K.A. Kumar & Manim. (2004)
123. Leucocoprinus lahorensiformis (S. Hussain, H. Ahmad, Afshan & Khalid) M. Asif, Saba & Vellinga (2024)
124. Leucocoprinus lahorensis (Qasim, T. Amir & Nawaz) M. Asif, Saba & Vellinga (2024)
125. Leucocoprinus lanzonii Bon, Migl. & Brunori (1989)
126. Leucocoprinus laosensis (Sysouph.) Kun L. Yang, Jia Y. Lin & Zhu L. Yang (2024)
127. Leucocoprinus lateritiopurpureus (Lj.N. Vassiljeva) M. Asif, Saba & Vellinga (2024)
128. Leucocoprinus leucothites (Vittad.) Redhead (2023)
129. Leucocoprinus lilaceus (Singer) Kun L. Yang, Jia Y. Lin & Zhu L. Yang (2024)
130. Leucocoprinus littoralis (Ménier) M. Asif, Saba & Vellinga (2024)
131. Leucocoprinus longistriatus (Peck) H.V. Sm. & N.S. Weber (1982)
132. Leucocoprinus lugdunensis S. Basso & N. Schwab (2025)
133. Leucocoprinus madecassensis R. Heim (1977)
134. Leucocoprinus magnicystidiosus H.V. Sm. & N.S. Weber (1982)
135. Leucocoprinus magnusianus (Henn.) Singer (1951)
136. Leucocoprinus mantadiaensis Ralaiv., Liimat. & Niskanen (2024)
137. Leucocoprinus margaritifer (Justo, Bizzi & Angelini) M. Asif, Saba & Vellinga (2024)
138. Leucocoprinus marginatus (Burl.) Migl. & Donato (2024)
139. Leucocoprinus marriageae (D.A. Reid) R.L. Zhao & J.X. Li (2025)
140. Leucocoprinus martinicensis Blanco-Dios (2020)
141. Leucocoprinus maublancii Locq. (1945)
142. Leucocoprinus mauritianus (Henn.) P. Mohr (2004)
143. Leucocoprinus medioflavoides (Bon) Migl. & Donato (2024)
144. Leucocoprinus medioflavus (Boud.) Bon (1976)
145. Leucocoprinus melanoloma (Singer) Singer (1938)
146. Leucocoprinus melanotrichus (Malençon & Bertault) Migl. & Donato (2024)
147. Leucocoprinus menieri (Sacc.) Migl. & Donato (2024)
148. Leucocoprinus microlepis Justo, Bizzi & Angelini (2021)
149. Leucocoprinus minimus (Berk.) Pegler (1981)
150. Leucocoprinus minutulus Singer (1941)
151. Leucocoprinus munnarensis T.K.A. Kumar & Manim. (2009)
152. Leucocoprinus muticolor Aberdeen (1992)
153. Leucocoprinus nanianae Bouriquet (1946)
154. Leucocoprinus nigricans B. Jezek (1973)
155. Leucocoprinus nivalis (W.F. Chiu) M. Asif, Saba & Vellinga (2024)
156. Leucocoprinus noctiphilus (Ellis) Heinem. (1977)
157. Leucocoprinus nympharum (Kalchbr.) M. Asif, Saba & Vellinga (2024)
158. Leucocoprinus nzumbae (C. Heisecke, A.A. Carvalho & M.A. Neves) Kun L. Yang, Jia Y. Lin & Zhu L. Yang (2024)
159. Leucocoprinus ophthalmus (Vellinga) Kun L. Yang, Jia Y. Lin & Zhu L. Yang (2024)
160. Leucocoprinus orientiflavus (Z.W. Ge) M. Asif, Saba & Vellinga (2024)
161. Leucocoprinus ovatus Raithelh. (2004)
162. Leucocoprinus pabbiensis (Usman & Khalid) M. Asif, Saba & Vellinga (2024)
163. Leucocoprinus pakistaniensis (Jabeen & Khalid) Asif & Saba (2024)
164. Leucocoprinus paracupresseus (Salom, Siquier, Planas & Espinosa) Kun L. Yang, Jia Y. Lin & Zhu L. Yang (2024)
165. Leucocoprinus paraplesius (Vellinga) Kun L. Yang, Jia Y. Lin & Zhu L. Yang (2024)
166. Leucocoprinus pardalotus (Vellinga) Redhead (2023)
167. Leucocoprinus parvipileus Justo, Bizzi, Angelini & Vizzini (2020)
168. Leucocoprinus pegleri (Justo, Bizzi & Angelini) M. Asif, Saba & Vellinga (2024)
169. Leucocoprinus pepinosporus Heinem. (1977)
170. Leucocoprinus phaeopus (Rick) Raithelh. (1987)
171. Leucocoprinus phantasmaticus Kun L. Yang, Jia Y. Lin & Zhu L. Yang (2025)
172. Leucocoprinus pilatianus (Demoulin) M. Asif, Saba & Vellinga (2024)
173. Leucocoprinus pinguipes (A. Pearson) Migl. & Donato (2024)
174. Leucocoprinus pleurocystidiatus (Migl. & Testoni) Migl. & Donato (2024)
175. Leucocoprinus proletarius (Rick) Raithelh. (1987)
176. Leucocoprinus proximus (E.F. Malysheva, Svetash. & E.M. Bulakh) M. Asif, Saba & Vellinga (2024)
177. Leucocoprinus pseudopilatianus (Migl., Rocabruna & Tabarés) Migl. & Donato (2024)
178. Leucocoprinus purpurascens (T. Guo & Z.W. Ge) Kun L. Yang, Jia Y. Lin & Zhu L. Yang (2024)
179. Leucocoprinus purpureolilacinus (Huijsman) M. Asif, Saba & Vellinga (2024)
180. Leucocoprinus purpureorimosus (Bon & Boiffard) Migl. & Donato (2024)
181. Leucocoprinus pusillus T.K.A. Kumar & Manim. (2009)
182. Leucocoprinus pyrrhophaeus (Vellinga) Kun L. Yang, Jia Y. Lin & Zhu L. Yang (2024)
183. Leucocoprinus pyrrhulus (Vellinga) M. Asif & Saba & Vellinga (2024)
184. Leucocoprinus revolutus (Rick) Raithelh. (1987)
185. Leucocoprinus rhodelephantinus (Boisselet & Eyssart.) Migl. & Donato (2024)
186. Leucocoprinus rhodolepis Ferretti-Cisn. & Wartchow (2022)
187. Leucocoprinus rimosovelatus (Contu) Migl. & Donato (2024)
188. Leucocoprinus rivulosus Raithelh. (1987)
189. Leucocoprinus roseovertens (Justo, Bizzi & Angelini) M. Asif, Saba & Vellinga (2024)
190. Leucocoprinus rubrobrunneus (E.F. Malysheva, Svetash. & E.M. Bulakh) M. Asif, Saba & Vellinga (2024)
191. Leucocoprinus rubroconfusus (Migl. & Coccia) Redhead (2023)
192. Leucocoprinus rubrosquamosus (Rick) Raithelh. (1991)
193. Leucocoprinus rubrotinctus (Peck) Redhead (2023)
194. Leucocoprinus russoceps (Berk. & Broome) Raithelh. (1987)
195. Leucocoprinus sabinae (Angelini, Justo & Vizzini) Kun L. Yang, Jia Y. Lin & Zhu L. Yang (2024)
196. Leucocoprinus salmoneophyllus (Bon & Guinb.) Migl. & Donato (2024)
197. Leucocoprinus sardous (Zecchin & Migl.) Migl. & Donato (2024)
198. Leucocoprinus scissus Justo, Bizzi & Angelini (2021)
199. Leucocoprinus serenus (Fr.) M. Asif, Saba & Vellinga (2024)
200. Leucocoprinus sericifer (Locq.) M. Asif, Saba & Vellinga (2024)
201. Leucocoprinus shixingensis (Z.S. Bi & T.H. Li) Kun L. Yang, Jia Y. Lin & Zhu L. Yang (2024)
202. Leucocoprinus silvestris (Justo, Bizzi & Angelini) M. Asif, Saba & Vellinga (2024)
203. Leucocoprinus squamulosus (Mont.) Pegler (1983)
204. Leucocoprinus stillatus (Justo, Bizzi & Angelini) M. Asif, Saba & Vellinga (2024)
205. Leucocoprinus straminellus (Bagl.) Narducci & Caroti (1995)
206. Leucocoprinus subcrystallifer (Z.W. Ge & Zhu L. Yang) M. Asif, Saba & Vellinga (2024)
207. Leucocoprinus subglobisporus Hongo (1985)
208. Leucocoprinus subhymenoderma (Bon & A. Caball.) Kun L. Yang, Jia Y. Lin & Zhu L. Yang (2024)
209. Leucocoprinus sublittoralis (Kühner ex Hora) Migl. & Donato (2024)
210. Leucocoprinus submontagnei Heinem. (1977)
211. Leucocoprinus subolivaceus (Migl. & L. Perrone) Migl. & Donato (2024)
212. Leucocoprinus subpurpureolilacinus (Z.W. Ge & Zhu L. Yang) M. Asif, Saba & Vellinga (2024)
213. Leucocoprinus subvolvatus (Malençon & Bertault) M. Asif, Saba & Vellinga (2024)
214. Leucocoprinus sulphurellus Pegler (1983)
215. Leucocoprinus sultanii (S. Hussain, H. Ahmad & Khalid) M. Asif, Saba & Vellinga (2024)
216. Leucocoprinus swaticus (Naseer, Ali & Khlaid) M. Asif, Saba & Vellinga (2024)
217. Leucocoprinus tanetensis Bouriquet (1946)
218. Leucocoprinus tangerinus (Y. Yuan & Jun F. Liang) Kun L. Yang, Jia Y. Lin & Zhu L. Yang (2024)
219. Leucocoprinus taniae (C. Heisecke & M.A. Neves) Kun L. Yang, Jia Y. Lin & Zhu L. Yang (2024)
220. Leucocoprinus tenellus (Boud.) Locq. (1943)
221. Leucocoprinus tener (P.D. Orton) M. Asif, Saba & Vellinga (2024)
222. Leucocoprinus tephrolepis Justo, Bizzi, Angelini & Vizzini (2020)
223. Leucocoprinus thalensis (Z. Khan, Izhar & Khalid) M. Asif, Saba & Vellinga (2024)
224. Leucocoprinus thoenii Heinem. (1977)
225. Leucocoprinus tricolor H.V. Sm. (1981)
226. Leucocoprinus tropicus Natarajan & Manjula (1982)
227. Leucocoprinus truncatus (A. Pearson) E. Ludw. & P. Mohr (2012)
228. Leucocoprinus truncatus (Z.W. Ge & Zhu L. Yang) M. Asif, Saba & Vellinga (2024)
229. Leucocoprinus turgipes (Justo, Bizzi & Angelini) M. Asif, Saba & Vellinga (2024)
230. Leucocoprinus umbonatus (S. Hussain, H. Ahmad & Afshan) M. Asif, Saba & Vellinga (2024)
231. Leucocoprinus vassiljevae (E.F. Malysheva, Svetash. & E.M. Bulakh) M. Asif, Saba & Vellinga (2024)
232. Leucocoprinus velutipes Heinem. (1977)
233. Leucocoprinus venezuelanus Dennis (1961)
234. Leucocoprinus violaceus Heinem. (1977)
235. Leucocoprinus virens (Y.R. Ma, Z.W. Ge & T.Z. Liu) M. Asif, Saba & Vellinga (2024)
236. Leucocoprinus viridariorum (G. Muñoz, A. Caball., Salom & Vizzini) Kun L. Yang, Jia Y. Lin & Zhu L. Yang (2024)
237. Leucocoprinus viridiflavoides (B.P. Akers & Angels) E. Ludw. (2012)
238. Leucocoprinus viridiflavus (Petch) E. Ludw. (2012)
239. Leucocoprinus viriditinctus (Berk. & Broome) M. Asif, Saba & Vellinga (2024)
240. Leucocoprinus viscidulus (Heinem.) M. Asif, Saba & Vellinga (2024)
241. Leucocoprinus wichanskyi (Pilát) Migl. & Donato (2024)
242. Leucocoprinus wynneae (Berk. & Broome) Locq. (1943)
243. Leucocoprinus zeyheri (Berk.) Singer (1943)
244. Leucocoprinus zeylanicus (Berk.) Boedijn (1940)
