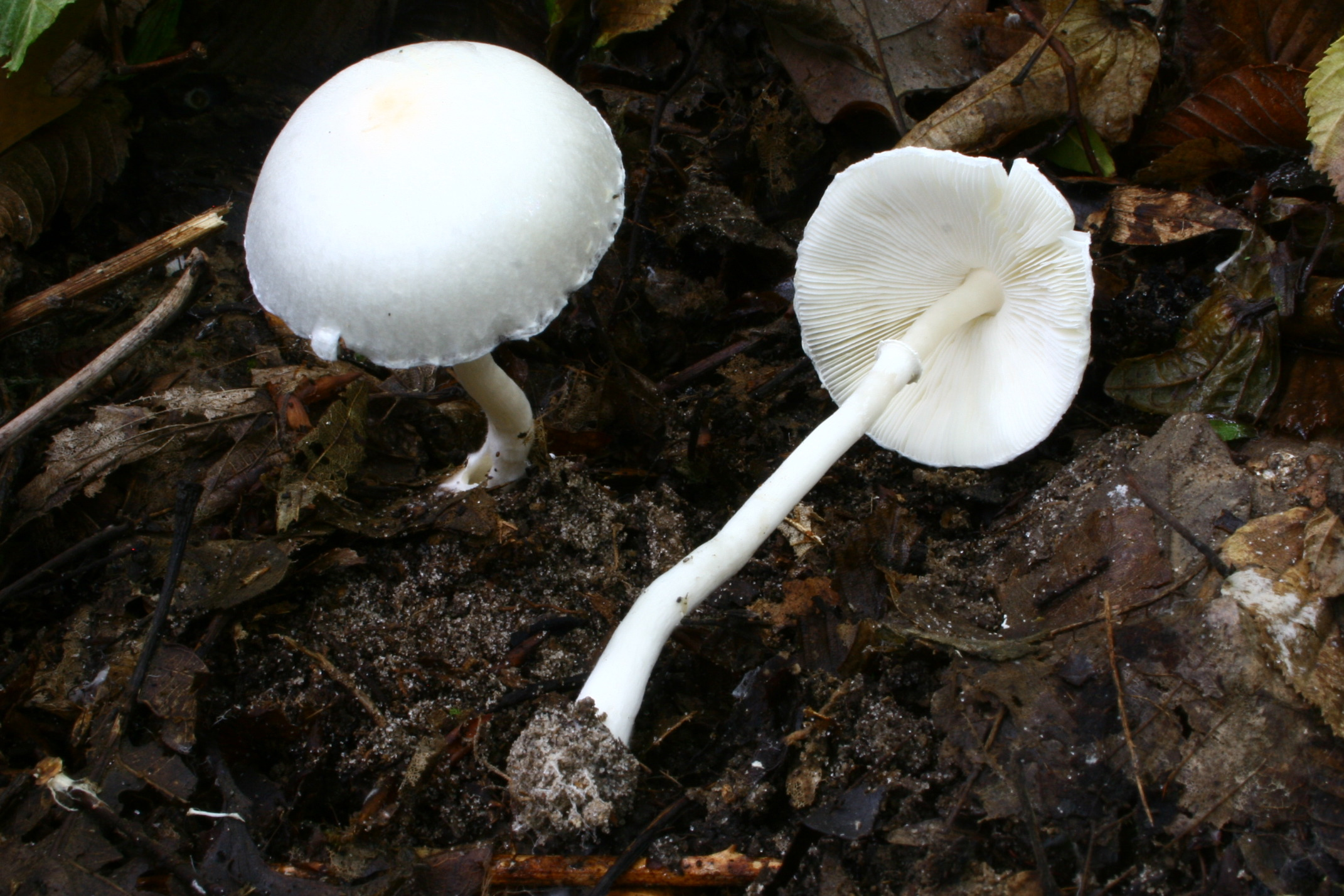

Scientific classification
- Kingdom: Fungi
- Division: Basidiomycota
- Class: Agaricomycetes
- Order: Agaricales
- Family: Agaricaceae
- Genus: Leucocoprinus
- Species: L. sericifer

Binomial name
- Leucocoprinus sericifer (Locq.) M. Asif, Saba & Vellinga (2024)

Synonyms
- Pseudobaeospora sericifera Locq. (1952); Lepiota cristata var. sericea Cool (1922); Leucoagaricus sericifer Vellinga (2000)

= Leucocoprinus sericifer =

Species of fungus

Leucocoprinus sericifer is a species of fungus in the family Agaricaceae.

== Taxonomy ==
It was originally described as Pseudobaeospora sericifera in 1952 by French mycologist Marcel Locquin.

It was reclassified as Leucoagaricus sericifer in 2000 by the mycologist Else Vellinga and then reclassified as Leucocoprinus sericifer in 2024.

== Habitat and distribution ==
It is widespread in Europe but may be confused with similar species.

== See also ==
- List of Leucocoprinus species
