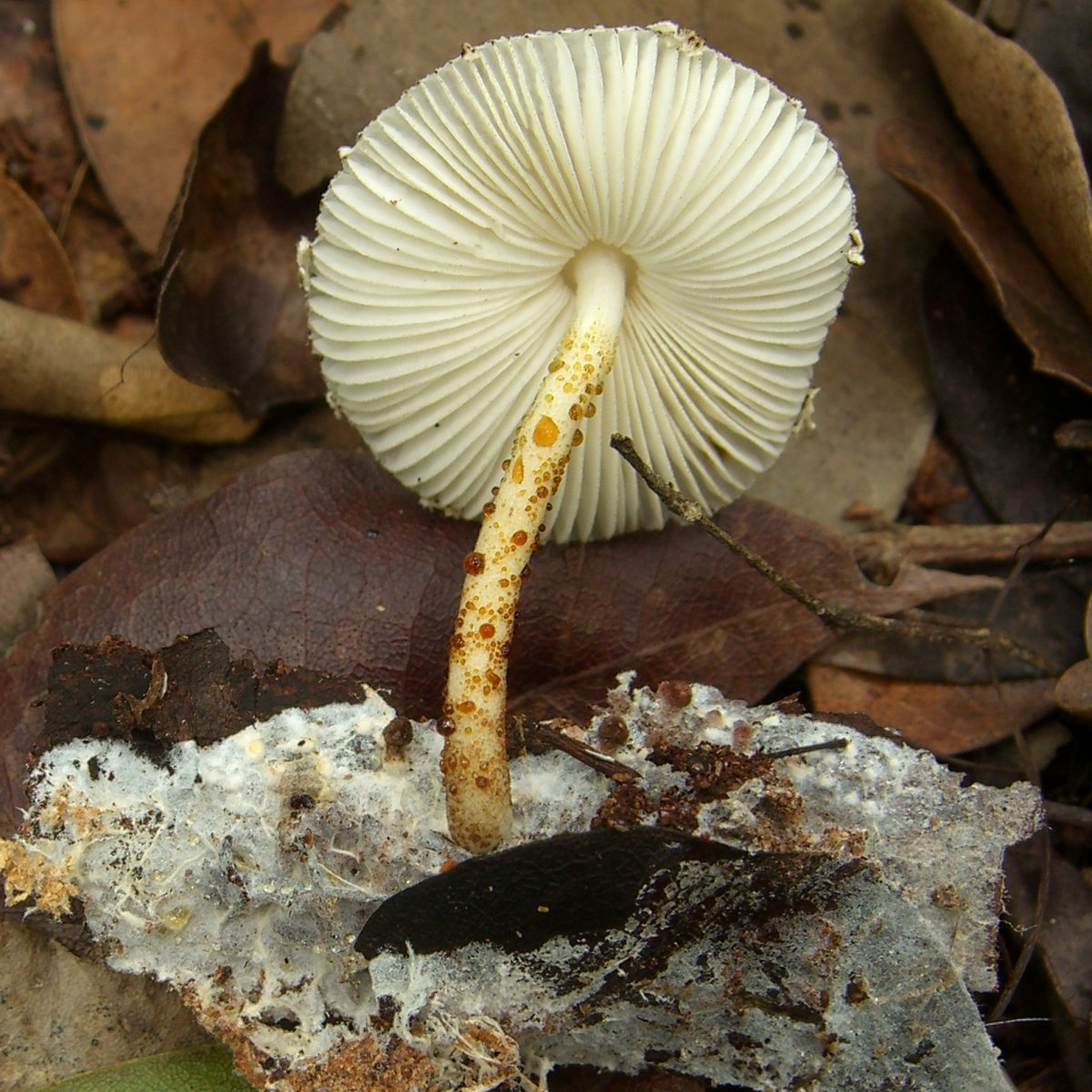

Scientific classification
- Kingdom: Fungi
- Division: Basidiomycota
- Class: Agaricomycetes
- Order: Agaricales
- Family: Agaricaceae
- Genus: Leucocoprinus
- Species: L. longistriatus

Binomial name
- Leucocoprinus longistriatus (Peck) H.V. Sm. & N.S. Weber (1982)

Synonyms
- Lepiota longistriata Peck (1898)

= Leucocoprinus longistriatus =

Species of fungus

Leucocoprinus longistriatus
- Mycological characteristics
- Gills on hymenium
- Cap is convex or flat
- Hymenium is free
- Stipe has a ring
- Spore print is white
- Ecology is saprotrophic
- Edibility is unknown

Leucocoprinus longistriatus is a species of mushroom producing fungus in the family Agaricaceae.

== Taxonomy ==
It was first described in 1898 by the American mycologist Charles Horton Peck and classified as Lepiota longistriata.

In 1982 it was reclassified as Leucocoprinus longistriatus by the mycologists Helen Vandervort Smith and Nancy S. Weber.

== Description ==
Leucocoprinus longistriatus is a small dapperling mushroom with thin (2-6mm thick) white flesh.

Cap: 4.3–8 cm wide, convex or flat with the cap edges sometimes lifting upwards with age. The umbo can be distinct or not present when mature and the cap margins have finely striate or plicate grooves running almost to the centre when mature. The surface is pale yellow, white or grayish and is covered in fine scales that are easily removed whilst the centre is brown to dark red surrounding the umbo. Stem: 4–8.3 cm long and 3.6mm thick tapering up from a bulbous base of 6-12mm when mature. The surface is pale yellow or white and smooth but stains a dull ochre colour when young stems are handled, the interior flesh is hollow. The small, ascending stem ring has pale brown edges and is located below the middle of the stem and is often just above the base (inferior to basal) however it may disappear. Gills: Yellowish white, becoming darker with maturity or when dry. Crowded and free with slight tufts on the edges. Spores: Elliptical or ovate lacking a distinct pore. Non-dextrinoid. 6–8 x 4.5-5 μm.

== Habitat and distribution ==
Peck described the species as growing in gardens in Alabama July with specimens also found in Cuba in gardens and amongst grass and in Jamaican woodland.

In a 1907 study the American mycologist Andrew Price Morgan documented the species growing in 'rich soil in gardens' in Alabama.

In 1937 Johannes Rick documented the species in Brazil but cited the name as Lepiota longestriata Peck. He stated that it grew in gardens and forests.

The 1982 study examined specimens found growing in tufts or scattered on wood chips and on soil under sweet gum and live oak trees. They were found in Jackson county, Mississippi.
