= Leucocoprinus armeniacoflavus =

Scientific classification
- Kingdom: Fungi
- Division: Basidiomycota
- Class: Agaricomycetes
- Order: Agaricales
- Family: Agaricaceae
- Genus: Leucocoprinus
- Species: L. armeniacoflavus

Binomial name
- Leucocoprinus armeniacoflavus E.Ludw. (2012)

Species of fungus

Leucocoprinus armeniacoflavus Mycological characteristics
- Gills on hymenium
- Cap is campanulate or umbonate
- Hymenium is free
- Stipe has a ring
- Spore print is white
- Ecology is saprotrophic
- Edibility is unknown

Leucocoprinus armeniacoflavus is a species of mushroom producing fungus in the family Agaricaceae.

== Taxonomy ==
It was first described in 2012 by Erhard Ludwig who classified it as Leucocoprinus armeniacoflavus and placed it in the Leucocoprinus section Denudati.

== Description ==
Leucocoprinus armeniacoflavus is a small yellow dapperling mushroom with pale yellow flesh.

Cap: 1.5-3.5 cm wide and campanulate (bell shaped) when mature with a pronounced umbo. The surface is yellow and covered in very coarse, yellow or pale yellow scales that do not wipe off whilst the centre of the cap is orange-brown or 'apricot' coloured. Sulcate striations run to the cap margins when mature. Stem: 3–5 cm tall and 35-50mm thick with a gradual taper up from the bulbous (clavate) base. The surface is yellow like the cap but is smooth and devoid of scales. The ascending, membranous stem ring is also yellow and may be permanent. Gills: Free, crowded and creamy coloured with a slight, light pinkish tone.Spores: Ovoid to amygdaliform or subcylindrical without a germ pore. Dextrinoid and metachromatic. 7–10.5 (12) x 4.5-6 μm. Basidia: 2-4 spored.

The mushroom dries to an ochre colour.

== Habitat and distribution ==
The specimens studied by Ludwig were found growing outside on the ground in Potsdam, Brandenburg, Germany where they were growing between a Pachyasandra species and Lamium purpureum (deadnettle). As of the 2012 publication they are known only from this location in Germany however they may have been introduced like many other Leucocoprinus species or may have a larger distribution but are simply not recorded.

GBIF has no recorded observations for this species.

== Etymology ==
The specific epithet armeniacoflavus derives from the Latin armeniacus meaning apricot coloured or yellow with a tinge of orange and flavus meaning yellow. It is named for the apricot yellow colouration of the central disc or umbo.

== Similar species ==
- Leucocoprinus aureofloccosus is very similar but has a delicate stem ring which quickly disappears and larger spores.
- Leucocoprinus thoenii may be similar with more pronounced striations and larger spores.
- Leucocoprinus flavus may be the most closely related known species but lacks a scaly cap and has smaller scales.
