= Leucocoprinus tricolor =

Scientific classification
- Kingdom: Fungi
- Division: Basidiomycota
- Class: Agaricomycetes
- Order: Agaricales
- Family: Agaricaceae
- Genus: Leucocoprinus
- Species: L. tricolor

Binomial name
- Leucocoprinus tricolor H.V. Sm. (1981)

Species of fungus

Leucocoprinus tricolor
- Mycological characteristics
- Gills on hymenium
- Cap is ovate or campanulate
- Hymenium is free
- Stipe has a ring
- Spore print is white
- Ecology is saprotrophic
- Edibility is unknown

Leucocoprinus tricolor is a species of mushroom producing fungus in the family Agaricaceae.

== Taxonomy ==
It was first described in 1981 by the mycologist Helen Vandervort Smith who classified it as Leucocoprinus tricolor.

== Description ==
Leucocoprinus tricolor is a small dapperling mushroom with thin pale yellow flesh.

Cap: 1.6–6 cm wide. Ovate, campanulate or conical and flattening as it matures often with a distinct umbo but sometimes it is absent. When young, the cap surface is covered in woolly scales (floccose) or scales (squamulose) with the squamules at or around the umbo presenting as greyish brown. The rest of the cap and the squamules coating it are pale yellow. The umbo may present as orange-yellow in immature specimens before turning brown and becoming smooth with age. The cap has distinct grooves or striations towards the cap edges which may present as striate, plicate or sulcate. The cap flesh is very thin and flexible but dry feeling. It is pale yellow and does not discolour with damage. Gills: Crowded and free. Pale yellow and very thin. Stem: 1.5–8 cm long and 2-6mm thick at the top, 6-11mm at the bulbous base. Smooth or sometimes with some fine scales towards the top and woolly tufts below. Lemon yellow at the top and golden yellow at the base. Lower scales have an orange tinge and sometimes discolour greyish-brown with damage or when handling. Stem flesh is also pale yellow. The yellow stem ring is small, membranous, thin and quickly disappears. Spores: Ellipsoid to subglobose with small germ pore. 8-11 x 7.2-9 μm. Taste: Indistinct but texture dry like cotton. Smell: Strong and pungent similar to that of the stinking dapperling, Lepiota cristata which is described as having an unpleasant rubbery or fishy odour.

When specimens are dried the umbo or centre of the cap turns greyish brown whilst the rest of the cap remains pale yellow. The base of the stem is orange or cadmium orange. Occasionally specimens do not present such a distinct three colour effect and remain roughly uniform but develop a grey or tan tint. Grey colours rarely occur when specimens are bruised or dried.

== Habitat and distribution ==
L. tricolor is scarcely recorded and little known. The specimens studied were collected from greenhouses at the University of Michigan Botanical Garden in 1975 as well as in some plant pots either filled with soil or bark in subsequent years. They were growing singly or in clusters. Since botanical gardens host exotic plants from all over the world it is unclear from this study where the species originated from or is native to.

== Etymology ==
The specific epithet tricolor refers to the three colour effect which is noticeable when specimens are dried.
