= Leucocoprinus canariensis =

Scientific classification
- Domain: Eukaryota
- Kingdom: Fungi
- Division: Basidiomycota
- Class: Agaricomycetes
- Order: Agaricales
- Family: Agaricaceae
- Genus: Leucocoprinus
- Species: L. canariensis

Binomial name
- Leucocoprinus canariensis P.Mohr & Dähncke (2004)

Species of fungus

Leucocoprinus canariensis Mycological characteristics
- Gills on hymenium
- Cap is convex or flat
- Hymenium is free
- Stipe has a ring
- Ecology is saprotrophic
- Edibility is unknown

Leucocoprinus canariensis is a species of mushroom producing fungus in the family Agaricaceae.

== Taxonomy ==
It was described in 2004 by the mycologists Peter Mohr and Rose Marie Dähncke who classified it as Leucocoprinus canariensis and suggested it belonged to section Denudati.

== Description ==
Leucocoprinus canariensis is a small dapperling mushroom with thin white flesh.

Cap: 4-5cm wide, convex to flat. The surface is white with velvety black brown scales and a dark brown centre. The margins lack striations. Gills: Free, crowded and cream coloured with a slight fimbriate edge. Stem: 5-6cm long and 5-6mm thick tapering upwards from a bulbous 13mm thick base. The surface is creamy white and covered in short downy hairs (pubescent). The narrow stem ring is white with dark edges on the underside and is located towards the bottom of the stem (inferior). Spores: 7-8 (8.5) x 3-3.5 μm. Cylindrical to ovoid or bean shaped, without a visible germ pore. Smooth, hyaline, dextrinoid and metachromatic. Basidia: 20-24 x 8-9 μm. Clavate. Four spored. Smell: Indistinct.

== Etymology ==
The specific epithet canariensis is in reference to the Canary Islands in which they were found.

== Habitat and distribution ==
The specimens studied were found in La Palma, Canary Islands where they were growing amongst undergrowth of Erica arborea beneath Pinus radiata trees during October.
