= Leucocoprinus brunneotegulis =

Scientific classification
- Domain: Eukaryota
- Kingdom: Fungi
- Division: Basidiomycota
- Class: Agaricomycetes
- Order: Agaricales
- Family: Agaricaceae
- Genus: Leucocoprinus
- Species: L. brunneotegulis

Binomial name
- Leucocoprinus brunneotegulis Dähncke, Contu & Alfredo (2011)

Species of fungus

Leucocoprinus brunneotegulis is a species of mushroom producing fungus in the family Agaricaceae.

== Taxonomy ==
It was first described in 2011 by the mycologists Rose Marie Dähncke, Marco Contu and Vizzini Alfredo who classified it as Leucocoprinus brunneotegulis.

== Habitat and distribution ==
The specimen studied was found on decaying leaf litter of pine trees in a greenhouse in the Canary islands.
