= Leucocoprinus pusillus =

Scientific classification
- Kingdom: Fungi
- Division: Basidiomycota
- Class: Agaricomycetes
- Order: Agaricales
- Family: Agaricaceae
- Genus: Leucocoprinus
- Species: L. pusillus

Binomial name
- Leucocoprinus pusillus T.K.A. Kumar & Manim. (2009)

Species of fungus

Leucocoprinus pusillus
- Mycological characteristics
- Gills on hymenium
- Cap is convex
- Hymenium is free
- Stipe has a ring
- Spore print is white
- Ecology is saprotrophic
- Edibility is unknown

Leucocoprinus pusillus is a species of mushroom producing fungus in the family Agaricaceae.

== Taxonomy ==
It was first described in 2009 by the Indian mycologists T.K. Arun Kumar & Patinjareveettil Manimohan who classified it as Leucocoprinus pusillus.

== Description ==
Leucocoprinus pusillus is a small dapperling mushroom with thin (up to 1mm thick) whitish flesh which discolours brown.

Cap: 1.3-1.6cm wide with a white, bulbous cap which expands with age to become convex with an indistinct umbo. It is covered in scattered fine dark brown or dark grey scales (squamules) which are more concentrated towards the centre disc. It has striations (sulcate-striate) towards the edges of the cap which curves inward at first and later flattens. Gills: Free, crowded and whitish but discolouring yellowish white or brown with age or upon drying. Stem: 2-2.2cm tall and 3-5mm thick and expanding towards the base where there is white mycelium. The exterior of the stem is whitish and discolours to brown with damage. The membranous, ascending stem ring is located towards the top of the stem (superior) and has dark brown scales on the edges. Spores: Ovoid or ellipsoid with a tiny germ pore. Dextrinoid. 7-10 x 5-6 μm. Smell: Indistinct.

== Etymology ==
The specific epithet pusillus is Latin for very small, tiny or insignificant. This is a reference to the diminutive size and stature of this species of mushroom.

== Habitat and distribution ==
L. pusillus is scarcely recorded, little known and may be confused with numerous other Leucocoprinus or Leucoagaricus species. The specimens studied were growing individually on manure rich soil in the state of Kerala, India.
