= Leucocoprinus minutulus =

Scientific classification
- Domain: Eukaryota
- Kingdom: Fungi
- Division: Basidiomycota
- Class: Agaricomycetes
- Order: Agaricales
- Family: Agaricaceae
- Genus: Leucocoprinus
- Species: L. minutulus

Binomial name
- Leucocoprinus minutulus Singer (1941)

Species of fungus

Leucocoprinus minutulus is a species of mushroom producing fungus in the family Agaricaceae.

== Taxonomy ==
It was first described in 1941 by the German mycologist Rolf Singer who classified it as Leucocoprinus minutulus.

== Description ==
Leucocoprinus minutulus is a small dapperling mushroom with thin white flesh.

Cap: 1.2cm wide with a brown surface and darker umbo. The margins are scaly and lacerated. Stem: 3cm long and 2-3mm wide with a slightly bulbous base. The surface is smooth and shiny and the interior is filled with white. The exterior colour is only described when dry, when it is brownish. The movable, double stem ring is very wide at 7mm, horizontally flat and is white-brown with light fringes at the edges. Gills: Free and remote from the stem, crowded and moderately wide at approximately 2mm. They are white but dry to a brownish colour. Spores: 7.5-11 x 5.8-6 μm. Hyaline with an apical germ pore and double membrane. Basidia: 28-33 x 8-9 μm. Four spored. Cheilocystidia: Numerous. 42-65 x 10-16.5 μm with an appendix that is 9-12 μm long. Clavato-appendiculatis (ampulliformibus).

== Habitat and distribution ==
L. minutulus is scarcely recorded and little known. The specimens studied by Singer were found in mixed forest containing Abies Nordmanniana and Fagus orientalis, in the valley of the river in the Krasnodar region of Russia.
