= Leucocoprinus russoceps =

Scientific classification
- Domain: Eukaryota
- Kingdom: Fungi
- Division: Basidiomycota
- Class: Agaricomycetes
- Order: Agaricales
- Family: Agaricaceae
- Genus: Leucocoprinus
- Species: L. russoceps

Binomial name
- Leucocoprinus russoceps Raithelh. (1987)

Synonyms
- Agaricus russoceps Berk & Broome (1871); Lepiota russoceps Sacc. (1887); Mastocephalus russoceps Kuntze (1891)

Species of fungus

Leucocoprinus russoceps Mycological characteristics
- Gills on hymenium
- Cap is campanulate or convex
- Hymenium is free
- Stipe has a ring
- Spore print is white
- Ecology is saprotrophic
- Edibility is unknown

Leucocoprinus russoceps is a species of mushroom producing fungus in the family Agaricaceae.

== Taxonomy ==
It was described in 1871 by the English botanists and mycologists Miles Joseph Berkeley and Christopher Edmund Broome who classified it as Agaricus (Lepiota) russoceps.

In 1887 it was reclassified as Lepiota russoceps by the Italian mycologist Pier Andrea Saccardo and then as Mastocephalus russoceps in 1891 by the German botanist Otto Kunze, however Kunze's Mastocephalus genus, along with most of 'Revisio generum plantarum' was not widely accepted by the scientific community of the age so it remained a Lepiota.

In 1987 it was reclassified as Leucocoprinus russoceps by the mycologist Jörg Raithelhuber.

== Description ==
Leucocoprinus russoceps is a small dapperling mushroom.

Cap: 1.5-2.5cm wide starting campanulate before flattening and expanding to convex. The surface is yellow-brown to ochre with a pulverulent, powdery coating and striations from the edges. Gills: Pale, 'almost free' and close. Stem: 4cm long and 1.5mm thick at the top with a claviform taper to 4mm wide at the base. The surface is paler than the cap sometimes with a slight greenish tint with age whilst the interior is stuffed with white flesh. The stem ring may disappear. Spores: Smooth, ovate to elliptic with a faint germ pore. 7.2-9 x 4.2-4.6 μm.

== Habitat and distribution ==
The specimens were found growing on the ground in forests in Brazil.

The specimens studied by Berk and Broome were found on the ground in June 1860 in Ceylon (now Sri Lanka).
