= Leucocoprinus parvipileus =

Scientific classification
- Kingdom: Fungi
- Division: Basidiomycota
- Class: Agaricomycetes
- Order: Agaricales
- Family: Agaricaceae
- Genus: Leucocoprinus
- Species: L. parvipileus

Binomial name
- Leucocoprinus parvipileus Justo, Bizzi, Angelini & Vizzini (2020)

Species of fungus

Leucocoprinus parvipileus Mycological characteristics
- Gills on hymenium
- Cap is campanulate or flat
- Hymenium is free
- Stipe has a ring
- Ecology is saprotrophic
- Edibility is unknown

Leucocoprinus parvipileus is a species of mushroom producing fungus in the family Agaricaceae.

== Taxonomy ==
It was described in 2020 by mycologists Alfredo Justo, Alberto Bizzi, Angelini Claudio and Alfredo Vizzini who classified it as Leucocoprinus parvipileus.

== Description ==
Leucocoprinus parvipileus is a small dapperling mushroom with very thin white flesh.

Cap: 7-15mm wide starting paraboloid before expanding to conico-canpanulate and finally flattening with age, sometimes with uplifted edges and a depressed centre. A small round umbo may or may not be present. The surface is completely grey-black when immature before breaking into a white background surface with small scattered grey scales which are sparser towards the margins and dense at the centre resulting in a small, darker centre disc. It is covered with radial fibrils and has strong sulcate striations at the cap edges that extend around halfway across the cap. The surface may discolour yellow to ochre with maturity. Gills: Free, moderately crowded and white but also discolouring yellow with age or after collecting. The edges remain white and are slightly eroded when viewed with a lens. Stem: 1.5-2.5 cm long and 1-2mm thick tapering up from a bulbous base of 3-3.5mm thick. It is cylindrical but thinner at the apex, where it is smooth and whitish but fibrillose elsewhere. Right above the bulbous base, the stem is marked with a thin grey line that runs around it like a ring and white mycelial cords may be present in abundance at the base. The thin, membranous, ascending stem ring is white and usually found towards the top of the stem (apical). Spores: 5-7 x 3–4.5 μm. Ellipsoid to ovoid without a germ pore, oblong to subcylindrical when viewed from the side. Dextrinoid and metachromatic. Basidia: 11-18 x 7-9 μm. Clavate. Four spored. Smell: Fungal or indistinct.

== Etymology ==
The specific epithet parvipileus derives from the Latin parvus meaning small and pileus meaning cap. This is a reference to the smaller cap size of this species compared with similar species.

== Habitat and distribution ==
The specimens studied were growing gregariously on leaf litter, woody debris and on old termite nests in humid, deciduous woodland in November to February. As of 2020, it is known only from the Dominican Republic and St. John in the US Virgin Islands.

== Similar species ==
Leucocoprinus parvipileus is considered part of the Leucocoprinus heinemannii complex which is a collection of similar looking species characterised by dark grey or black scales and a dark centre disc. These species can be very difficult to distinguish based only on macroscopic features and may require microscopic or genetic sequencing. The small size and yellowing as well as the white mycelial cords at the base may help distinguish it from some similar species.
