= Leucocoprinus nanianae =

Scientific classification
- Domain: Eukaryota
- Kingdom: Fungi
- Division: Basidiomycota
- Class: Agaricomycetes
- Order: Agaricales
- Family: Agaricaceae
- Genus: Leucocoprinus
- Species: L. nanianae

Binomial name
- Leucocoprinus nanianae Bouriquet (1946)

Species of fungus

Leucocoprinus nanianae Mycological characteristics
- Gills on hymenium
- Cap is convex or flat
- Hymenium is free
- Stipe has a ring
- Spore print is cream to white
- Ecology is saprotrophic
- Edibility is unknown

Leucocoprinus nanianae is a species of mushroom producing fungus in the family Agaricaceae.

== Taxonomy ==
It was first described in 1946 by the French mycologist Gilbert Bouriquet who classified it as Leucocoprinus nanianae. This species is currently accepted but appears to have received no attention since and may have simply been forgotten about as the publication in which it was described, Bulletin l’Académie Malgache, Nouvelle série, tome 25 is rare and contains many other species for which there is no information available.

== Description ==
Leucocoprinus nanianae is a large white dapperling mushroom with white flesh. The description for this species very closely matches that of Leucocoprinus cretaceus and it is possible that it is simply a synonym.

Cap: Starts globular before spreading out and expanding to 15cm wide, without an umbo. The surface is white and powdery or floury with some small bunches of fibrils that are coloured very light brown. The illustration for this species shows some yellowing at the centre disc and possibly at the gills where they meet the stem although this is not described in the text. Stem: 15cm long and 15mm thick with a bulbous base. The surface is white and covered in a powdery coating the same as the cap, it is flexible when mature and hollows with age but when immature the stem is in the shape of an elongated bulb. No details of the stem ring are noted besides that it is well developed however the accompanying illustration shows a large ring above the middle of the stem or towards the top (apical to superior). Gills: Free, crowded and cream coloured. Spore print: Very light creamy white. Spores: 8.5-12.25 x 5.5-8.5 μm. Dextrinoid. Guttulate with a thick membrane and large germ pore, very very pale yellow. Smell: Pleasant. Taste: Pleasant.

== Habitat and distribution ==
The specimens studied by Bouriquet were found growing in a large cluster on an old pile of garbage near the agricultural station of Nanisana in Madagascar during December of 1942. What this 'garbage' consisted of is not specified and it is possible that Bouriquet may have been describing a compost heap at the agricultural station. L. cretaceus and other Leucocoprinus species are very versatile saprotrophs which are capable of growing on many different substrates so compost, manure, plant debris or wood are all possible.

GBIF has no recorded observations for this species.

== Etymology ==
L. nanianae was presumably named for the location in which it was found, Nanisana, Madagascar. The accompanying illustration for this species created by Mare Rabarijaona is captioned 'Leucocoprinus Nanisanae' so it is unclear which name was intended and which was in error.

== Edibility ==
Bouriquet fed 400g of cooked mushroom to an 'average weight dog' and noted that it did not cause any trouble. This of course cannot be assumed as ensuring the mushroom is safe for human consumption however it was also noted that some of the natives considered the mushroom edible.

== Similar species ==
Leucocoprinus cretaceus and Leucocoprinus elaeidis are described similarly and mostly only differ in the noted presence of a yellow or light brown colour accenting the otherwise white, powdery surface. L. elaeidis is also only documented in one old book and it is possible that it and L. nanianae are simply synonyms of L. cretaceus that have yet to be reclassified. L. cretaceus is the only routinely documented Leucocoprinus species that resembles this description and some observations of it display some yellow or brown discolouration at the cap or a yellow stem beneath the white scales. At present it is not clear if these are all the same species or if some distinction should be made based on these characteristics.
