= Leucocoprinus bakeri =

Scientific classification
- Kingdom: Fungi
- Division: Basidiomycota
- Class: Agaricomycetes
- Order: Agaricales
- Family: Agaricaceae
- Genus: Leucocoprinus
- Species: L. bakeri

Binomial name
- Leucocoprinus bakeri (Dennis) Singer (1982)

Synonyms
- Lepiota bakeri Dennis (1952)

Species of fungus

Leucocoprinus bakeri
- Mycological characteristics
- Gills on hymenium
- Cap is convex
- Hymenium is free
- Stipe has a ring
- Spore print is white
- Ecology is saprotrophic
- Edibility is unknown

Leucocoprinus bakeri is a species of mushroom producing fungus in the family Agaricaceae.

== Taxonomy ==
It was first described in 1952 by the British mycologist Richard William George Dennis who classified it as Lepiota bakeri.

In 1982, it was reclassified as Leucocoprinus bakeri by the German mycologist Rolf Singer.

== Description ==
Leucocoprinus bakeri is a small dapperling mushroom with white flesh.

Cap: 7 cm wide. Convex, with a pinkish-buff (light brownish yellow) surface and fine brown scales (squamules) and a brown umbo. It is striated at the edges of the cap. Stem: Bulbous at the base and tapering to the tip with a pinkish-buff surface that has woolly (tomentose) scales below the ring. The membranous stem ring is located towards the top of the stem (superior) and is white with brown edges. Gills: Free, crowded (5-6mm) and white. Spores: Elliptical, dextrinoid, 5-7 x 3.5-4 μm.

== Habitat and distribution ==
L. bakeri is scarcely recorded and little known. It has been found in Costa Rica and Trinidad.
