= Leucocoprinus magnusianus =

Scientific classification
- Domain: Eukaryota
- Kingdom: Fungi
- Division: Basidiomycota
- Class: Agaricomycetes
- Order: Agaricales
- Family: Agaricaceae
- Genus: Leucocoprinus
- Species: L. magnusianus

Binomial name
- Leucocoprinus magnusianus (Henn.) Singer (1949)

Synonyms
- Lepiota magnusiana Henn. (1891); Hiatula magnusiana Singer (1943)

Species of fungus

Leucocoprinus magnusianus Mycological characteristics
- Gills on hymenium
- Cap is campanulate
- Hymenium is free
- Stipe has a ring
- Spore print is white
- Ecology is saprotrophic
- Edibility is unknown

Leucocoprinus magnusianus is a species of mushroom producing fungus in the family Agaricaceae.

== Taxonomy ==
It was first described in 1891 by the German mycologist Paul Christoph Hennings who classified it as Lepiota magnusiana.

The German mycologist Rolf Singer reclassified it as Hiatula magnusiana in 1943 and then as Leucocoprinus magnusianus in 1949.

== Description ==
Lepiota magnusiana only has a brief description provided by Hennings. It is described as having red flesh and a stem which discolours reddish. This is a common feature in Lepiota species but would be unusual for a Leucocoprinus.

Cap: 1–5 cm wide, starting ovoid or cylindrical before expanding to campanulate (bell shaped) with thin flesh. The surface is white and covered in powdery scales whilst the centre discolours yellow with age and the cap edges are striated. Gills: Free, crowded and white. Stem: 2–7 cm tall and 2–3 mm thick with a white surface that discolours reddish and a hollow interior. The membranous stem ring has a woolly (floccose) texture. Spores: Ovoid. Smell: Indistinct.Taste: Indistinct.

== Habitat and distribution ==
L. magnusianus is scarcely recorded and little known. Hennings documented it from a hothouse in the Berlin botanical garden.
