= Leucocoprinus rhodolepis =

Scientific classification
- Domain: Eukaryota
- Kingdom: Fungi
- Division: Basidiomycota
- Class: Agaricomycetes
- Order: Agaricales
- Family: Agaricaceae
- Genus: Leucocoprinus
- Species: L. rhodolepis

Binomial name
- Leucocoprinus rhodolepis Ferretti-Cisn. & Wartchow (2022)

Species of fungus

Leucocoprinus rhodolepis Mycological characteristics
- Gills on hymenium
- Cap is convex or flat
- Hymenium is free
- Stipe has a ring
- Ecology is saprotrophic
- Edibility is unknown

Leucocoprinus rhodolepis is a species of mushroom producing fungus in the family Agaricaceae.

== Taxonomy ==
It was described in 2022 by mycologists Nathália U. Ferretti-Cisneros and Felipe Wartchow who classified it as Leucocoprinus rhodolepis.

== Description ==
Leucocoprinus rhodolepis is a small dapperling mushroom with very thin white, unchanging flesh.

Cap: Up to 3.6cm wide, plano-convex with an umbo. The surface is white with a pronounced centre covered in pinkish-orange scales with a pink tint spreading across the rest of the cap and fading towards the margins, where the scales are sparse. At the very centre of the cap the scales are a darker greyish colour. The margins are very thin and straight or slightly decurved and plicate-striate striations run part way up the cap surface. Gills: Free, crowded to subcrowded and white. The edges are even or may be slightly serrated. Stem: 5cm long and 4mm thick with a slight taper up from the bulbous base that is up to 11mm thick. It is cylindrical or compressed with a slight curve towards the base and the surface is smooth and white to very pale greyish. The small, white stem ring is located towards the top of the stem (apical) and has striations on the underside. Spores: 6.9-7.8 (8.8) x 4.9-5.9 μm or 7.7 x 5.1 μm on average. Ellipsoid or rarely oblong with slight thick walls and no germ pore. Hyaline, dextrinoid and metachromatic, colourless in 3% KOH solution. Basidia: 17.6-20.6 x 7.8-9.8 (10.8) μm. Clavate, 2-4 spored.

== Etymology ==
The specific epithet rhodolepis derives from the Greek rhodo meaning rose coloured and lepis meaning scales. This is in reference to the pinkish scales on the cap.

== Habitat and distribution ==
The specimens studied were growing on solitary on soil surrounded by Caatinga desert vegetation near São José dos Cordeiros, Paraíba, Brazil. As of 2022, it was known only from this location.
