= Leucocoprinus medioflavus =

Scientific classification
- Domain: Eukaryota
- Kingdom: Fungi
- Division: Basidiomycota
- Class: Agaricomycetes
- Order: Agaricales
- Family: Agaricaceae
- Genus: Leucocoprinus
- Species: L. medioflavus

Binomial name
- Leucocoprinus medioflavus (Boud.) Bon (1976)

Synonyms
- Lepiota medioflava Boud. (1894); Leucoagaricus medioflavus Bon (1976); Leucocoprinus medioflavus var. niveus Migl. & Rava (1999)

Species of fungus

Leucocoprinus medioflavus Mycological characteristics
- Gills on hymenium
- Cap is depressed or umbonate
- Hymenium is free
- Stipe has a ring
- Spore print is white
- Ecology is saprotrophic
- Edibility is unknown

Leucocoprinus medioflavus is a species of mushroom producing fungus in the family Agaricaceae.

== Taxonomy ==
It was first described in 1894 by the French mycologist Jean Louis Émile Boudier who classified it as Lepiota medioflava. Boudier also provided various illustrations of the mushroom in different stages of growth.

In 1976 it was classified as Leucocoprinus medioflavus and as the synonym Leucoagaricus medioflavus by the French mycologist Marcel Bon.

In 1999 the variant Leucocoprinus medioflavus var. niveus was described by the mycologists Vincenzo Migliozzi & Marcello Rava. This is now considered a synonym.

== Description ==
Leucocoprinus medioflavus is a small dapperling mushroom with thin white flesh and a pronounced yellow umbo. Boudier described this mushroom in 1894 as follows:

Cap: 2–3 cm wide. White, striated and with a powdery white coating or finely woolly (tomentose) to silky texture. Bulbous or cylindrical when immature expanding to flat with a depressed centre and a prominent yellow umbo. Cap edges lift upwards when mature. Gills: White, free, crowded. Stem: 4–7 cm tall (including the cap thickness). White but tapers up from the thicker base which is often yellow. The stem ring is in the middle of the stem (median) and curls upwards. The stem is slightly scaly (furfuraceous) above the ring and woolly (tomentose) below. Spore print: White Spores: Equilateral, ovate, obtuse, often filled with a small droplet. 5-6 x 3 μm.

== Habitat and distribution ==
L. medioflavus is scarcely recorded and little known. Boudier's 1894 description says the specimens studied were found in France on moist earth in the heat of June, growing in large numbers inside a nursery greenhouse.

== Etymology ==
The specific epithet medioflavus (originally medioflava) derives from the Latin medio meaning 'in the middle' and flavus meaning yellow, flaxen or blonde. This is a reference to the distinct yellow umbo in the centre of the mushroom.
