= Leucocoprinus venezuelanus =

Scientific classification
- Kingdom: Fungi
- Division: Basidiomycota
- Class: Agaricomycetes
- Order: Agaricales
- Family: Agaricaceae
- Genus: Leucocoprinus
- Species: L. venezuelanus

Binomial name
- Leucocoprinus venezuelanus Dennis (1961)

Species of fungus

Leucocoprinus venezuelanus Mycological characteristics
- Gills on hymenium
- Cap is campanulate or umbonate
- Hymenium is free
- Stipe has a ring
- Spore print is white
- Ecology is saprotrophic
- Edibility is unknown

Leucocoprinus venezuelanus is a species of mushroom producing fungus in the family Agaricaceae.

== Taxonomy ==
It was first described in 1961 by the British mycologist Richard William George Dennis who classified it as Leucocoprinus venezuelanus.

== Description ==
Leucocoprinus venezuelanus is a small dapperling mushroom with thin (1mm) white flesh which is unchanging in colour.

Cap: 2-3.5m wide when expanded to its full campanulate (bell shaped) or umbonate shape with very thin and fragile flesh. The surface colour is described as greyish orange and brownish orange in the central disc however as these colours are cited from the 1967 Methuen Handbook of Colour which is out of print and virtually inaccessible today they are hard to convert into modern colour descriptions. As the cap expands the coloured surface breaks up into tiny granular scales against a white background with grooved striations (sulcate-striate) around the cap edges. Gills: Free, close and white. Stem: 3–4 cm tall and 1-2mm thick tapering upwards from a slightly bulbous base. The interior is hollow and the surface is white but it may discolour brown when handled with a pale brown colouring on the lower stem below the ring. The thin, membranous stem ring is located towards the top of the stem (superior) but may disappear, it is described as white or white on the top and brownish below. The stem detaches easily from the cap. Spores: Ovoid to ellipsoid. Dextrinoid. 6-8.5 x 4-5.5 μm. Smell: Floury (farinaceous).

== Habitat and distribution ==
L. venezuelanus is scarcely recorded and little known. The specimens described by Dennis were found growing on the ground near Caracas, Venezuela. The British mycologist David Pegler examined specimens found on a dead stump on Santa Cruz Island in the Galápagos.

It has also been reported from the Democratic republic of the Congo and a 2003 study documented this species growing in Kerala state, India where they were found growing scattered on soil in a tropical botanic garden.

== Similar species ==
- Leucocoprinus brebissonii is described as similar but with larger spores.
