= Leucocoprinus nigricans =

Scientific classification
- Kingdom: Fungi
- Division: Basidiomycota
- Class: Agaricomycetes
- Order: Agaricales
- Family: Agaricaceae
- Genus: Leucocoprinus
- Species: L. nigricans

Binomial name
- Leucocoprinus nigricans Jezek (1973)

Species of fungus

Leucocoprinus nigricans
- Mycological characteristics
- Gills on hymenium
- Cap is conical or flat
- Hymenium is adnexed
- Stipe has a ring
- Spore print is white
- Ecology is saprotrophic
- Edibility is unknown

Leucocoprinus nigricans is a species of mushroom producing fungus in the family Agaricaceae.

== Taxonomy ==
It was first described in 1973 by the Czech mycologist Bohumil Ježek who classified it as Leucocoprinus nigricans. This species is currently accepted but appears to have received no attention since and may have simply been forgotten about as the issue of Mykologický sborník - Časopis Českých Houbař it was published in is not easily accessible.

== Description ==
Leucocoprinus nigricans is a small white dapperling mushroom with thin (5 mm thick) white flesh. Ježek provided only a brief description of this species in Latin and some of the terms used are antiquated now and do not easily translate.

Cap: 2.3 cm wide, 1.5 cm high and conical when immature expanding to 5.5 cm and flattening with age with striations at the edges. The surface is a 'dirty white' colour and has a frosty or fibrous coating when young sometimes with some slight reddening at the top and a sticky surface. Stem: 4.5 cm long and 5 mm thick with a white, silky and fibrillose surface. Slight striations run vertically up the stem and the base of the stem gradually blackens and may even become black. The white stem ring is located towards the top of the stem but sometimes disappears. Gills: Adnexed, crowded and white. Spore print: White. Spores: Ovoid. 6.5-7.5 x 4-4.5 μm. Smell: Indistinct. Taste: Indistinct.

== Habitat and distribution ==
The specimens studied by Ježek were found growing in groups in Cabo Frio, Brazil in 1971 and the description was published in 1973. Ježek died in Cabo Frio on the first of June 1973 so if he was intending to study this species further, it unfortunately did not happen.

GBIF has no recorded observations for this species.

== Etymology ==
The specific epithet nigricans derives from the Latin for 'blackening' and refers to the colouration of the base of the stem.
