= Leucocoprinus velutipes =

Scientific classification
- Kingdom: Fungi
- Division: Basidiomycota
- Class: Agaricomycetes
- Order: Agaricales
- Family: Agaricaceae
- Genus: Leucocoprinus
- Species: L. velutipes

Binomial name
- Leucocoprinus velutipes (Beeli) Heinem. (1977)

Synonyms
- Lepiota flavescens Beeli (1932)

Species of fungus

Leucocoprinus velutipes
- Mycological characteristics
- Gills on hymenium
- Cap is campanulate or convex
- Hymenium is free
- Stipe has a ring
- Spore print is white
- Ecology is saprotrophic
- Edibility is unknown

Leucocoprinus velutipes is a species of mushroom producing fungus in the family Agaricaceae.

== Taxonomy ==
It was first described in 1932 by the Belgian mycologist Maurice Beeli and was illustrated in 1936. Beeli had classified the species as Lepiota flavescens apparently without realising that this name had already been used by the American mycologist Andrew Price Morgan in 1907. Thus Beeli's classification was illegitimate.

In 1977 it was reclassified as Leucocoprinus velutipes by the Belgian mycologist Paul Heinemann.

Morgans's Lepiota flavescens was ultimately reclassified as Leucocoprinus flavescens in 1981.

== Description ==
Leucocoprinus velutipes is a dapperling mushroom with thin whitish-yellow flesh.

Cap: 5-6cm wide, campanulate expanding to convex or flattened with a pronounced umbo. The surface is whitish-yellow with reddish-brown woolly scales (tomentose) on the umbo whilst the rest of the cap is speckled with fine brown scales. The cap edges have slight striations which do not extend far across the cap. Stem: 7-9cm tall and 3-4mm thick tapering gradually from the base which is 10mm wide. The interior is slightly hollow and the surface is brownish-yellow with a brown shaggy coating from top to bottom. The membranous, ascending stem ring is yellowish with some brown details. Gills: Free, moderately crowded (5mm), yellowish-white. Spore print: White. Spores: Ellipsoid. 8.3-9.8 x 6.0-6.8 μm. The whole mushroom drys dark brown.

== Habitat and distribution ==
L. velutipes is scarcely recorded and little known. Beeli and Heinemann's studies were based on specimens found in Zaire, Central Africa (now the Democratic Republic of the Congo) where they were found near the town of Binga growing in groups on dead wood.

GBIF only contains one recorded observation of this species.

== Etymology ==
The specific epithet velutipes derives from the Latin velutinus meaning velvety and stipes meaning stem. and refers to the shaggy stem this mushroom.
