= Leucocoprinus castroi =

Scientific classification
- Kingdom: Fungi
- Division: Basidiomycota
- Class: Agaricomycetes
- Order: Agaricales
- Family: Agaricaceae
- Genus: Leucocoprinus
- Species: L. castroi

Binomial name
- Leucocoprinus castroi Blanco-Dios (2003)

Species of fungus

Leucocoprinus castroi
- Mycological characteristics
- Gills on hymenium
- Cap is conical or campanulate
- Hymenium is free
- Stipe has a ring
- Spore print is white
- Ecology is saprotrophic
- Edibility is unknown

Leucocoprinus castroi is a species of mushroom-producing fungus in the family Agaricaceae.

== Taxonomy ==
It was first described in 2003 by the mycologist Jaime Bernardo Blanco-Dios who classified it as Leucocoprinus castroi.

== Description ==
Leucocoprinus castroi is a small dapperling mushroom with thin white flesh.

Cap: Usually 2–3.5 cm wide, 5 cm in the largest specimens. It starts elliptical or conical expanding to campanulate (bell shaped) and finally flat or concave and is very fragile. The surface is uniformly yellow when young but in maturity it has yellow or orange striations with white grooves between running from the cap edge up to the edge of the centre disc, which is yellow to brownish-ochre in colour. The cap is covered in woolly scales (floccose) which are white in the grooves, yellow to brown in the centre disc and yellow to orange elsewhere. Stem: Usually 4.8–8.3 cm tall, up to 9.5 cm in the tallest specimens, and 0.15–0.7 mm thick. Yellow to greenish in the top half of the stem becoming paler towards the base with whitish ochre tones. Fragile and hollow and covered in white woolly scales. Sometimes bulging in the middle of the stem. The beige or yellow, membranous stem ring is located towards the top of the stem (superior) and may disappear. It is similarly scaly to the stem. Gills: Whitish, crowded and free. Spores: Ellipsoid with a germ pore. Dextrinoid. 8.5–11.5 x 6.5–8.5 μm. Smell: Pleasant and like aniseed at the cap but like Scleroderma at the base. Taste: Mushroomy.

== Habitat and distribution ==
L. castroi is scarcely recorded and little known. It has been found in coastal and sub-coastal forests of Pinus pinaster trees in the Galicia region of Spain. It is one of the few Leucocoprinus species documented as growing outside in the wild in Europe since most species in this genus are tropical and only spread via human activity outside of tropical regions.

== Etymology ==
The specific epithet castroi is named for the Spanish mycologist María Luisa Castro in recognition of her study of mycology in Galicia.
