= Leucocoprinus violaceus =

Scientific classification
- Kingdom: Fungi
- Division: Basidiomycota
- Class: Agaricomycetes
- Order: Agaricales
- Family: Agaricaceae
- Genus: Leucocoprinus
- Species: L. violaceus

Binomial name
- Leucocoprinus violaceus Heinem. (1977)

Species of fungus

Leucocoprinus violaceus
- Mycological characteristics
- Gills on hymenium
- Cap is campanulate or conical
- Hymenium is free
- Stipe has a ring
- Spore print is white
- Ecology is saprotrophic
- Edibility is unknown

Leucocoprinus violaceus is a species of mushroom producing fungus in the family Agaricaceae.

== Taxonomy ==
It was first described in 1977 by the Belgian mycologist Paul Heinemann who classified it as Leucocoprinus violaceus

== Description ==
Leucocoprinus violaceus is a dapperling mushroom with thin white flesh.

Cap: 5-6cm wide, campanulate or conical and expanding to flatten with age. The surface is white with purplish brown scales which are more concentrated at the brown disc or slight umbo in the centre. The cap edges are striated to about a third of the way up the cap. Gills: Free, crowded and white discolouring to greyish with age. Stem: 5-6cm tall and 4-5mm thick, it is stiff and slightly hollow with a smooth white surface above the stem ring and purplish scales towards the base. The membranous, white stem ring is movable and fragile and located above the middle of the stem. Spore print: White. Spores: Amygdaliform. 6.3-8.4 x 4.9-6.7 μm. Taste: Very bitter. When dry the cap and stem discolour brown whilst the gills turn slightly olive-brown.

== Habitat and distribution ==
L. violaceus is scarcely recorded and little known. Heinemann's study was based on specimens from Zaire, Central Africa (now the Democratic Republic of the Congo) where they were found near Lake Edward and Lake Kivu in tufts on the ground of a plantation containing Grevillea plants.

GBIF only contains one recorded observation of this species.

== Edibility ==
Whilst the edibility or potential toxicity of this species are unknown, Heinemann notes that the locals did not consume this mushroom.

== Etymology ==
The specific epithet violaceus is Latin for violet and refers to the purplish scales towards the base of this mushroom.

== Similar species ==
Heinemann notes that this species is similar to Leucocoprinus tenellus and L. lilacino-gradulosus (now classified as Leucocoprinus ianthinus) but distinguished by the spore size.
