= Leucocoprinus scissus =

Scientific classification
- Domain: Eukaryota
- Kingdom: Fungi
- Division: Basidiomycota
- Class: Agaricomycetes
- Order: Agaricales
- Family: Agaricaceae
- Genus: Leucocoprinus
- Species: L. scissus

Binomial name
- Leucocoprinus scissus Justo, Angelini & Bizzi (2021)

Species of fungus

Leucocoprinus scissus Mycological characteristics
- Gills on hymenium
- Cap is flat or conical
- Hymenium is free
- Stipe has a ring
- Spore print is white
- Ecology is saprotrophic
- Edibility is unknown

Leucocoprinus scissus is a species of mushroom producing fungus in the family Agaricaceae.

== Taxonomy ==
It was described in 2021 by the mycologists Alfredo Justo, Angelini Claudio and Alberto Bizzi who classified it as Leucocoprinus scissus.

== Description ==
Leucocoprinus scissus is a small dapperling mushroom with thin whitish flesh.

Cap: 1–4 cm wide starting conical-campanulate before expanding to conical to flat with a slight umbo. The surface is white with small, scattered brownish-ochre scales that surround the umbo and become sparser towards the cap margins. The margins are striated almost to the centre of the cap but are fragile and prone to splitting at maturity.

Gills: Free, white and moderately crowded, with a bulge in the middle (ventricose).

Stem: 2.5–6 cm wide and 2.5-4mm thick. It is cylindrical with a slight clavate taper up from the base which is up to 6mm thick. The surface is smooth and whitish above the stem ring and ochre-yellow below with the colour becoming more intense towards the base, where white threadlike (filiform) rhizomorphs may be present. The membranous stem ring is small and white but is easily removed and may sometimes be missing.

Spores: Ovoid to ellipsoid, without a germ pore. Dextrinoid and metachromatic. (5.5) 6-8 (8.5) x 4-6 (6.5) μm.

Smell: Indistinct.

== Etymology ==
The specific epithet scissus is Latin for torn or split. This is in reference to the tendency for the edges of the cap to split at maturity.

== Habitat and distribution ==
The species was discovered in the Dominican Republic where it was found growing gregariously on leaf litter in deciduous woodland in November.
