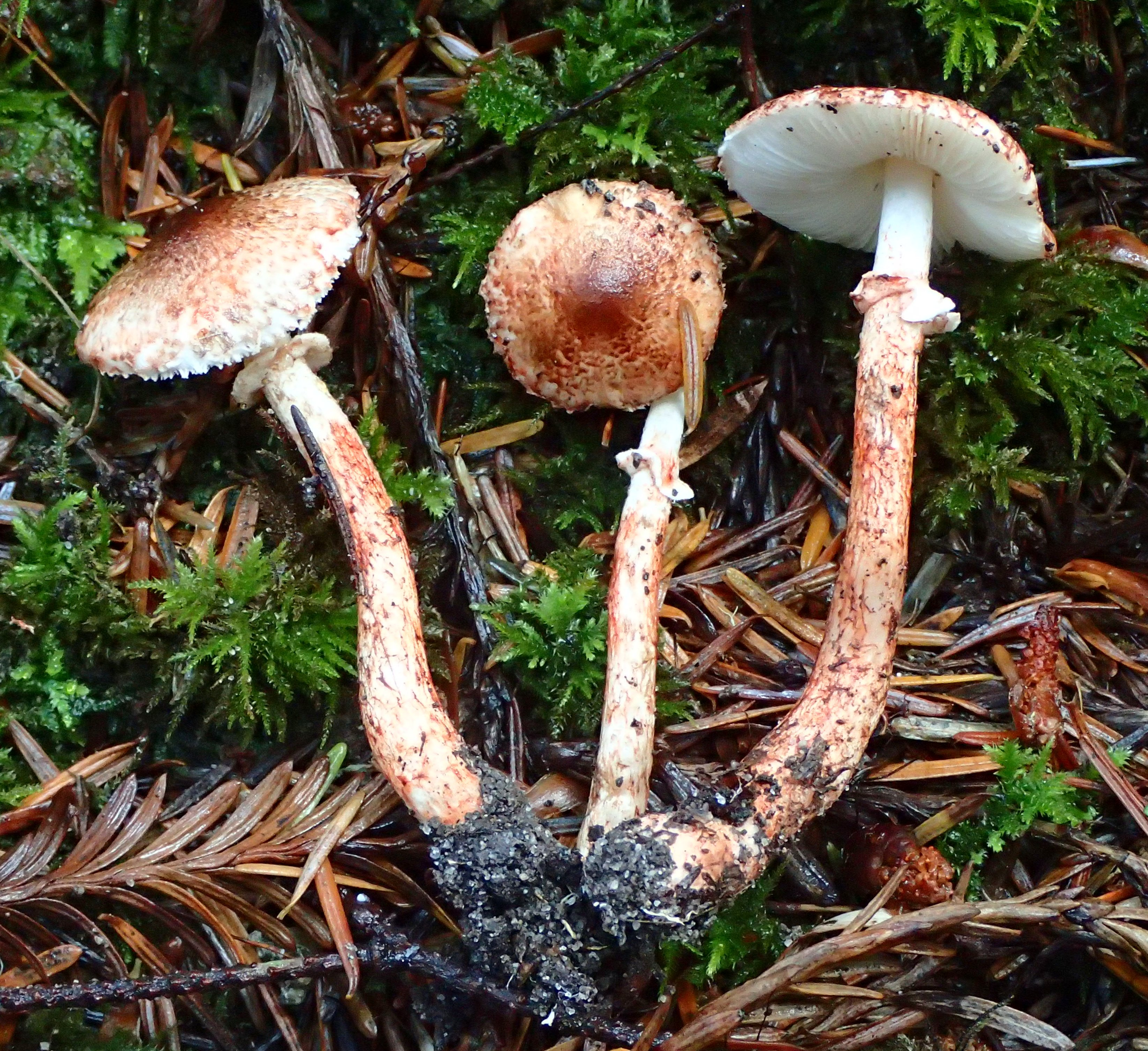

Scientific classification
- Kingdom: Fungi
- Division: Basidiomycota
- Class: Agaricomycetes
- Order: Agaricales
- Family: Agaricaceae
- Genus: Leucocoprinus
- Species: L. flammeotinctus

Binomial name
- Leucocoprinus flammeotinctus (Kauffman) Redhead

Synonyms
- Lepiota flammeotincta Kauffman

= Leucocoprinus flammeotinctus =

Leucocoprinus flammeotinctus
- Mycological characteristics
- Gills on hymenium
- Cap is convex or flat
- Hymenium is free
- Stipe has a ring
- Spore print is white
- Edibility is unknown

Leucocoprinus flammeotinctus, commonly known as the flaming parasol, is a species of mushroom in the genus Leucocoprinus. It is found in North America.

== Taxonomy ==
Leucocoprinus flammeotinctus was first described as Lepiota flammeotincta by Kauffman in 1925. However, in 2023, Redhead transferred it to the genus Leucocoprinus.

== Description ==
The cap of Leucocoprinus flammeotinctus is 1.5–7.5 centimeters in diameter, fibrillose, and has a dark-colored disc in the middle. The stipe is about 4–9 centimeters long and has a thin ring. The gills are white. The entire mushroom, except the gills, stains blood red when bruised, before turning brown.

== Habitat and ecology ==
Leucocoprinus flammeotinctus grows in pine needles in coniferous forests, often in coastal areas of the Pacific Northwest. It usually grows at somewhat low elevations.
