= Leucocoprinus brunnescens =

Scientific classification
- Kingdom: Fungi
- Division: Basidiomycota
- Class: Agaricomycetes
- Order: Agaricales
- Family: Agaricaceae
- Genus: Leucocoprinus
- Species: L. brunnescens

Binomial name
- Leucocoprinus brunnescens (Peck) Pegler (1983)

Synonyms
- Lepiota brunnescens Peck (1904); Leucocoprinus brunnescens Locq. (1945); Leucoagaricus brunnescens Bon (1981); Lepiota brunnescens var. erythropus Rick (1930)

Species of fungus

Leucocoprinus brunnescens
- Mycological characteristics
- Gills on hymenium
- Cap is convex or umbonate
- Hymenium is free
- Stipe has a ring
- Spore print is white
- Ecology is saprotrophic
- Edibility is unknown

Leucocoprinus brunnescens is a species of mushroom producing fungus in the family Agaricaceae.

== Taxonomy ==
It was first described in 1904 by the American mycologist Charles Horton Peck who classified it as Lepiota brunnescens.

In 1945 it was classified as Leucocoprinus brunnescens by the French mycologist Marcel Locquin.

It was briefly classified as Leucoagaricus brunnescens by the French mycologist Marcel Bon in 1981 before again being reclassified as Leucocoprinus brunnescens in 1983 by the British mycologist David Pegler.

== Description ==
Leucocoprinus brunnescens is a small dapperling mushroom with thin white flesh.

Cap: 2-3cm. Convex or flat with an umbo. Whitish colour with brown specks or scales (squamules) forming on the cap except in the centre. The cap flesh is thin and the edges may develop cracks. Stem: 3-5cm long and 2-4mm thick. White, hollow and fibrous with a slightly thicker base. Small persistent annulus in the middle of the stem (median). Gills: White, crowded and free. Spores: Elliptical, 6-8 x 4-5 μm. Taste: Sweet.

The flesh bruises brown with discolouration also presenting when dry with the stem below the stem ring at first turning reddish-brown before becoming brown. Peck notes that within 12-24 hours the entire drying mushroom turns brown.

Locquin's 1945 description varies in that it notes pink gills bordered with black. It's possible that this is a description of the drying mushroom or it may be another species as Locquin was likely aware of given his note of 'L. brunnescens Peck ?'

== Habitat and distribution ==
L. brunnescens is scarcely recorded and little known. Peck's 1904 study was on specimens found in open woods and grass near St. Louis, Missouri in July through August whilst Pegler's study was on species in the Antilles islands of the Caribbean.

== Etymology ==
The specific epithet brunnescens is Latin for 'brownish' or 'browning'. This is a reference to the brown discolouration of this mushroom.
