= Leucocoprinus mauritianus =

Scientific classification
- Domain: Eukaryota
- Kingdom: Fungi
- Division: Basidiomycota
- Class: Agaricomycetes
- Order: Agaricales
- Family: Agaricaceae
- Genus: Leucocoprinus
- Species: L. mauritianus

Binomial name
- Leucocoprinus mauritianus (Henn.) P.Mohr (2004)

Synonyms
- Lepiota mauritiana Henn. (1908)

Species of fungus

Leucocoprinus mauritianus Mycological characteristics
- Gills on hymenium
- Cap is ovate or campanulate
- Hymenium is free
- Stipe has a ring
- Ecology is saprotrophic
- Edibility is unknown

Leucocoprinus mauritianus is a species of mushroom producing fungus in the family Agaricaceae.

== Taxonomy ==
It was described in 1908 by the German mycologist Paul Christoph Hennings who classified it as Lepiota mauritiana.

In 2004 it was reclassified as Leucocoprinus mauritianus by the mycologist Peter Mohr.

== Description ==
Leucocoprinus mauritianus is a small dapperling mushroom with thin white flesh. Hennings provided only a basic description of this species:

Cap: 1.6-2.2 cm wide, ovoid to campanulate with an obtuse umbo. The surface is grey with a scaly brown umbo and sulcate striations from the margin, where there are fissures and folds. Gills: Freem, crowded and pale with a ventricose bulge. Stem: Smooth and pale running equally to the base, which is not significantly bulbous. Hollow. The stem ring membranous and whitish. Spores: 9-12 x 6-7 μm. Subovoid. Hyaline.

== Etymology ==
The specific epithet mauritianus, originally mauritiana is named for Mauritius where it was found.

== Habitat and distribution ==
The specimens studied by Hennings were found growing on the ground in Mauritius.
