= Leucocoprinus bonianus =

Scientific classification
- Kingdom: Fungi
- Division: Basidiomycota
- Class: Agaricomycetes
- Order: Agaricales
- Family: Agaricaceae
- Genus: Leucocoprinus
- Species: L. bonianus

Binomial name
- Leucocoprinus bonianus (Pat.) Zhu L.Yang (2000)

Synonyms
- Hiatula boniana Pat. (1897)

Species of fungus

Leucocoprinus bonianus
- Mycological characteristics
- Gills on hymenium
- Cap is convex or umbonate
- Hymenium is free
- Stipe is bare
- Ecology is saprotrophic
- Edibility is unknown

Leucocoprinus bonianus is a species of mushroom producing fungus in the family Agaricaceae.

== Taxonomy ==
It was first described in 1897 by the French mycologist Narcisse Théophile Patouillard who classified it as Hiatula boniana.

In 2000 it was reclassified as Leucocoprinus bonianus by Zhu Liang Yang.

== Description ==
Leucocoprinus bonianus is a small yellow dapperling mushroom with thin flesh.

Patouillard provided only a brief description of this species:

Cap: Up to 5 cm wide, convex and flattening with age with an umbo, it is thin but not fragile. The surface is sulphur yellow and dry with powdery scales. Stem: 7 cm tall with a slightly bulbous base. The surface is likewise yellow but less intense than the cap, it is covered in dry powdery scales whilst the interior is hollow. Patouillard noted no stem ring. Gills: Free and presumably yellow (Patouillard only describes the entire 'plant' as being sulphur coloured). Spores: Ovoid with a visible germ pore. 8-10 x 5-6 μm. Patouillard described it as being similar to his previous observation of Leucocoprinus cretaceus but differing in colour and the lack of a ring. However, as the ring in many Leucocoprinus species can be fragile and may quickly disappear it is not certain if this specimen had a ring to begin with and simply lost it before being collected.

In 2000 Yang examined the preserved holotype specimen collected by Patouillard which consists of only two pieces of dried cap and added the following to the description:

Cap: 4-5 cm wide, brownish (many Leucocoprinus species dry to a brownish colour) with long striations from the cap edges and very thin flesh. The surface is covered with dark grey to blackish woolly scales (floccose squamules) however the color of these is also likely to have darkened and changed as a result of the drying process.

Based on the long striations, the thin flesh and microscopic features it was placed in Leucocoprinus and noted to be very similar to L. birnbaumii. However the distinction from this species is based only on the longer striations and darker coloured scales on the cap and this seems uncertain when the comparison has been made from a dried, partial specimen that is over 100 years old.

== Habitat and distribution ==
The specimens studied by Patouillard were found during August and only described as growing from the ground near the habitations of Ke So in Vietnam. This is about 35 miles south of Hanoi.

== Similar species ==
- Leucocoprinus birnbaumii
