= Leucocoprinus tropicus =

Scientific classification
- Kingdom: Fungi
- Division: Basidiomycota
- Class: Agaricomycetes
- Order: Agaricales
- Family: Agaricaceae
- Genus: Leucocoprinus
- Species: L. tropicus

Binomial name
- Leucocoprinus tropicus Natarajan & Manjula (1982)

Species of fungus

Leucocoprinus tropicus
- Mycological characteristics
- Gills on hymenium
- Cap is convex or depressed
- Hymenium is free
- Stipe has a ring
- Spore print is white
- Ecology is saprotrophic
- Edibility is unknown

Leucocoprinus tropicus is a species of mushroom producing fungus in the family Agaricaceae.

== Taxonomy ==
It was first described in 1982 by the Indian mycologists K.V. Natarajan and B. Manjula who classified it as Leucocoprinus tropicus.

== Description ==
Leucocoprinus tropicus is a dapperling mushroom with thin whitish-yellow flesh.

Cap: 6.5-7cm wide, flattened convex and depressing with maturity. The surface is white with a brownish umbo and loose brown scales scattered across the surface which may disappear with age. There are striations at the cap edges. Gills: Free, crowded and white. Stem: 9-10 cm tall and 5-8mm thick without a noticeably thicker base or any tapering. The surface is white and the interior hollow and white mycelium may be present at the base. The persistent, membranous stem ring is white and located towards the top of the stem (superior). Spore print: White. Spores: Ellipsoid with a germ pore. 8.8-13.2 x 5.5-7.7 μm.

== Habitat and distribution ==
L. tropicus is scarcely recorded and little known. The specimens studied by Natarajan and Manjula were found growing on soil at Raj Bhavan in Tamil Nadu, India in November 1978.

== Etymology ==
The specific epithet tropicus derives from the Greek tropikós meaning tropical.
