= Leucocoprinus domingensis =

Scientific classification
- Domain: Eukaryota
- Kingdom: Fungi
- Division: Basidiomycota
- Class: Agaricomycetes
- Order: Agaricales
- Family: Agaricaceae
- Genus: Leucocoprinus
- Species: L. domingensis

Binomial name
- Leucocoprinus domingensis Justo, Bizzi, Angelini & Vizzini (2020)

Species of fungus

Leucocoprinus domingensis Mycological characteristics
- Gills on hymenium
- Cap is campanulate or flat
- Hymenium is free
- Stipe has a ring
- Ecology is saprotrophic
- Edibility is unknown

Leucocoprinus domingensis is a species of mushroom producing fungus in the family Agaricaceae.

== Taxonomy ==
It was described in 2020 by mycologists Alfredo Justo, Alberto Bizzi, Angelini Claudio and Alfredo Vizzini who classified it as Leucocoprinus domingensis.

== Description ==
Leucocoprinus domingensis is a small dapperling mushroom with thin (1-2mm) white flesh.

Cap: 2.5-3.5 cm wide starting paraboloid before expanding to conico-campanulate and finally flattening with age with a slight depression at the centre. A small round umbo may or may not be present. The surface is white but densely covered in small dark-grey to black scales which leave only the surface towards the cap edges uncovered. The centre disc is broad with denser, dark scales and the margins have only slight sulcate striations that extend up to one-third of the way across the cap. Gills: Free, moderately crowded and white. Not discolouring with age or collection. Under a lens the edges are slightly eroded. Stem: 3–5 cm long and 3-5mm thick. It is thin and cylindrical to clavate with a taper up from the slightly bulbous base. The surface is smooth and white with white mycelial cords at the base. The thin, membranous, ascending stem ring is white with blackish-grey edges and located about halfway up the stem (median). Spores: 4.5-6 x 3-4 μm. Ellipsoid to ovoid without a germ pore, oblong to subcylindrical when viewed from the side. Dextrinoid and metachromatic. Basidia: 11.5-19 x 6.5-9 μm. Clavate to spheropedunculate. Four spored.

== Etymology ==
The specific epithet domingensis derives from the capital of the Dominican Republican, Santo Domingo where the species was found.

== Habitat and distribution ==
The specimens studied were growing gregariously on leaf litter and woody debris in a botanical garden amongst broad-leaved trees during November. As of 2020 is known only from the Dominican Republic.

== Similar species ==
Leucocoprinus domingensis is considered part of the Leucocoprinus heinemannii complex which is a collection of similar looking species characterised by dark grey or black scales and a dark centre disc. These species can be very difficult to distinguish based only on macroscopic features and may require microscopic or genetic sequencing.
