= Leucocoprinus fibrillosus =

Scientific classification
- Kingdom: Fungi
- Division: Basidiomycota
- Class: Agaricomycetes
- Order: Agaricales
- Family: Agaricaceae
- Genus: Leucocoprinus
- Species: L. fibrillosus

Binomial name
- Leucocoprinus fibrillosus Raithelh. (1988)

Species of fungus

Leucocoprinus fibrillosus
- Mycological characteristics
- Gills on hymenium
- Cap is campanulate or ovate
- Hymenium is free
- Stipe has a ring
- Ecology is saprotrophic
- Edibility is unknown

Leucocoprinus fibrillosus is a species of mushroom producing fungus in the family Agaricaceae.

== Taxonomy ==
It was first described in 1988 by the mycologist Jörg Raithelhuber who classified it as Leucocoprinus fibrillosus.

== Description ==
Leucocoprinus fibrillosus is a small dapperling mushroom. Raithelhuber described the species from a dried specimen deposited in the Herbarium Anchieta - Fungi Rickiani in Brasil. The specimen had been deposited in 1943 by Johannes Rick who had identified it as Lepiota erythrella and provided an accompanying description of the fresh mushroom. Raithelhuber also examined two similar specimens from the herbarium at the University of Buenos Aires which he identified as Leucoagaricus erythrellus and Lepiota lanoso-farinosa.

Cap: 5-10cm wide, starting campanulate (bell shaped) before becoming hemispherical with a slight umbo and moderately thick flesh. The surface is smooth and pinkish-orange with radial fissures or wrinkles (rimose) and scales (subsquamous). Stem: 5-10cm long with a thickened base. The surface is white and it is cylindrical and hollow. The stem ring is movable or nearly movable. Gills: White. No other description is provided besides that the gill edges are entire (integrae). Spores: Ovoid to elliptical or subamygdaliform, thin walled and smooth without a germ pore. 7.3-8.4 x 3.5-4.5 μm. The spores are hyaline but the colour in Melzer's reagent is not made clear in the description with Raithelhuber describing them as 'not or slightly amyloid or pseudoamyloid' in the Latin diagnosis and 'at most weakly dextrinoid' in German.

The colouration of this mushroom is described as very variable presenting with reddening, bluing or green discolouration. However it is not noted specifically where this discolouration takes place so it may apply to the whole mushroom. Raithelhuber classified this mushroom as a Leucocoprinus species based on the campanulate, wrinkled cap and the discolouration but noted that the spores of Leucocoprinus species typically have a germ pore whilst this specimen was missing one. However Leucocoprinus are typically striated rather than wrinkled as described and this discolouration does not sound typical for them so the placement of this specimen in Leucocoprinus seems strange and it may simply not have been reclassified yet.

== Etymology ==
The specific epithet fibrillosus is Latin for fibrous. Raithelhuber stated that the description largely agreed with Carlo Luigi Spegazzini's 1899 description of Lepiota erythrella var. fibrillosa so that name was retained.

== Habitat and distribution ==
The specimens studied by Raithelhuber were found in the woods near São Salvador, Brazil in 1943.
