= Leucocoprinus tanetensis =

Scientific classification
- Domain: Eukaryota
- Kingdom: Fungi
- Division: Basidiomycota
- Class: Agaricomycetes
- Order: Agaricales
- Family: Agaricaceae
- Genus: Leucocoprinus
- Species: L. tanetensis

Binomial name
- Leucocoprinus tanetensis Bouriquet (1946)

Species of fungus

Leucocoprinus tanetensis Mycological characteristics
- Gills on hymenium
- Cap is convex
- Hymenium is free
- Stipe has a ring
- Spore print is cream
- Ecology is saprotrophic
- Edibility is edible

Leucocoprinus tanetensis is a species of mushroom producing fungus in the family Agaricaceae.

== Taxonomy ==
It was first described in 1946 by the French mycologist Gilbert Bouriquet who classified it as Leucocoprinus tanetensis. This species is currently accepted but appears to have received no attention since and may have simply been forgotten about as the publication in which it was described, Bulletin l’Académie Malgache, Nouvelle série, tome 25 is rare and contains many other species for which there is no information available.

== Description ==
Leucocoprinus tanetensis is a large white mushroom with white flesh which does not discolour red. The description for this species more closely resembles a Chlorophyllum species so it may be a synonym for another species which has yet to be reclassified.

Cap: Starts ovoid before spreading out and expanding to 14cm wide, has a slight, broad umbo. The surface is creamy white and covered in many brown scales. Stem: Over 20cm long and 10mm thick with a bulbous base. It is firm with a white surface and a hollow, fibrous centre. No details of the stem ring are noted besides that it is very developed however the accompanying illustration shows a large ring towards the top of the stem (apical). Gills: Free, crowded and whitish but discolouring greenish with age. Spore print: Cream. Spores: 12.5-15.5 x 8.75-12 μm. Dextrinoid. Guttulate with a thick membrane and a very distinct germ pore, very pale yellow. Smell: Pleasant. Taste: Pleasant.

== Habitat and distribution ==
The specimens studied by Bouriquet were found growing in open grassy areas in Magagascar near cattle manure and were often found on the low heights known as tanety. These mushrooms were found in January near Antananarivo and were said to be abundant during this month and common all over the island.

GBIF has no recorded observations for this species.

== Etymology ==
Tanety is the local term used to describe hillside areas. L. tanetensis was likely named for this word.

== Edibility ==
Bouriquet states that this species is one of the best edible mushrooms in Grande-Île, which is another name for Madagascar. He notes that it was listed as one of the species authorised for sale in Antananarivo.
