= Leucocoprinus flavus =

Scientific classification
- Domain: Eukaryota
- Kingdom: Fungi
- Division: Basidiomycota
- Class: Agaricomycetes
- Order: Agaricales
- Family: Agaricaceae
- Genus: Leucocoprinus
- Species: L. flavus

Binomial name
- Leucocoprinus flavus (Beeli) Heinem. (1977)

Synonyms
- Coprinus flavus Beeli (1928)

Species of fungus

Leucocoprinus flavus Mycological characteristics
- Gills on hymenium
- Cap is conical or campanulate
- Hymenium is free
- Stipe has a ring
- Ecology is saprotrophic
- Edibility is unknown

Leucocoprinus flavus is a species of mushroom producing fungus in the family Agaricaceae.

== Taxonomy ==
It was first described in 1928 by the Belgian mycologist Maurice Beeli who classified it as Coprinus flavus.

It was reclassified as Leucocoprinus flavus by the Belgian mycologist Paul Heinemann in 1977.

== Description ==
Leucocoprinus flavus is a small yellow dapperling mushroom with thin flesh.

Cap: 1.8-2.7 cm wide. Conical to campanulate (bell shaped). Entirely yellow and covered in a powdery yellow material which sticks to the fingers. The small umbo is deeper in colour than the cap and dries brown. Until dried, striations on the cap are not significant but rather it is smooth and slippery. The cap flesh is thin. Gills: Crowded and free. Pale yellow. Beeli described them as yellow but blackening. Stem: 5–6 cm long and 2mm thick at the top, 3-7mm thick at the bulbous base. Pale yellow or similarly yellow to the cap. Hollow. Sometimes presenting visible mycelium at the base. Persistent yellow stem ring towards the top of the stem (superior). It is membranous and curls upwards. Spores: Ovate to almond shaped or elliptical, without a pore. Dextrinoid. 7.5-9.0 x 3.8-5.3 μm. Beeli described them as grey-purple. Taste: Mild.

== Habitat and distribution ==
L. flavus is scarcely recorded and little known. The specimen studied in 1923 was found on rotting wood in July in Congo. Material studied in 1982 was collected under mixed hardwood trees in Owen county, Indiana.

== Similar species ==
- Lepiota flava is described similarly by Beeli though he does not note the powdery yellow coating on the cap. Paul Heinemann considered it to be synonymous in 1977, as did Helen Vandervort Smith and Nancy S. Weber in 1982. However it remains classified as a separate species.
