= Leucocoprinus antillarum =

Scientific classification
- Domain: Eukaryota
- Kingdom: Fungi
- Division: Basidiomycota
- Class: Agaricomycetes
- Order: Agaricales
- Family: Agaricaceae
- Genus: Leucocoprinus
- Species: L. antillarum

Binomial name
- Leucocoprinus antillarum Justo, Angelini & Bizzi (2021)

Species of fungus

Leucocoprinus antillarum Mycological characteristics
- Gills on hymenium
- Cap is campanulate or convex
- Hymenium is free
- Stipe has a ring
- Spore print is white
- Ecology is saprotrophic
- Edibility is unknown

Leucocoprinus antillarum is a species of mushroom producing fungus in the family Agaricaceae.

== Taxonomy ==
It was described in 2021 by the mycologists Alfredo Justo, Claudio Angelini and Alberto Bizzi who classified it as Leucocoprinus antillarum.

== Description ==
Leucocoprinus antillarum is a small dapperling mushroom with thin flesh.

Cap: 3.5-4.5 cm wide starting ovate before expanding to conical-campanulate and then flattening to convex or plano-convex. Finally developing a slight depression with maturity with or without a small umbo. The surface is completely white with velvety scales when immature but the umbo develops a brownish-ochre or yellowish-ochre colour as it matures and white to brownish-grey or ochre fibrillous scales are scattered sparsely across the rest of the cap surface, becoming sparser towards the margins. The surface background remains white but with a pinkish-grey tint around the centre fading to white towards the margins, which have striations that reach around halfway up the cap surface. Gills: Free, fairly crowded and white. Stem: 4.5–6 cm tall and 2.5-5mm thick and cylindrical with an only slightly wider base. The surface is whitish with white fibrillose scales on the bottom half and white rhizomorphs at the base. The ascending, membranous stem ring is white but sometimes develops a greyish-ochre edge. Spores: Ovoid to amygdaliform without a germ pore. Dextrinoid and metachromatic. (5) 5.5-7 x 3.5-5 (5.5) μm. Basidia: 15-27 x 8.12 μm.Smell: Indistinct.

== Etymology ==
The specific epithet antillarum derives from the Antilles in which the species was found.

== Habitat and distribution ==
The species was discovered in the Dominican Republic where it grows gregariously on the ground amongst leaf litter in deciduous woodland in August to January. Phylogenetic data has also suggested that the species is present in Brazil, Panama and Guadeloupe based on comparison with other specimens collected.

== Similar species ==
- Leucocoprinus fuligineopuctatus is but distinguished by finer, darker scales that make a more defined central disc, as well as a yellowish colour towards the bottom of the stem.
- Lepiota phaeosticta produces smaller mushrooms with darker grey-black scales and grows on wood.
- Lepiota nigropunctata is distinguished by smaller mushrooms and smaller spores.
- Lepiota tepeitensis also has smaller spores.
- Lepiota subclypeolaria has similar macroscopic features but has white scales on the cap surface that extend beyond the umbo. It is also distinguished by microscopic details.

These similar Lepiota species may actually be Leucocoprinus or Leucoagaricus species that have yet to be reclassified.
