= Leucocoprinus pepinosporus =

Scientific classification
- Domain: Eukaryota
- Kingdom: Fungi
- Division: Basidiomycota
- Class: Agaricomycetes
- Order: Agaricales
- Family: Agaricaceae
- Genus: Leucocoprinus
- Species: L. pepinosporus

Binomial name
- Leucocoprinus pepinosporus Heinem. (1977)

Species of fungus

Leucocoprinus pepinosporus is a species of mushroom-producing fungus in the family Agaricaceae.

== Taxonomy ==
It was first described in 1977 by the Belgian mycologist Paul Heinemann who classified it as Leucocoprinus pepinosporus.

== Description ==
Leucocoprinus pepinosporus is a small dapperling mushroom. The description given by Heinemann is scant and does not provide much detail.

Cap: The surface is white with greyish-brown scales in the centre disc. The cap is submembranous with striated edges. No dimensions are provided in the description. Stem: It has a thick base and a fragile ring but no other details are provided. The colour is described as 'white then pink' but it is unclear if this is referring to pink discolouration with age, bruising or different colouration across the stem surface as it also says white stem flesh and pink below the cap. Spores: 11.2–13.5 x 7.4–8.1 μm. Amygdaliform with apical elongation but no germ pore. Cheilocystidia: 45–50 x 14–20 (28) μm. Lanceolate.

== Habitat and distribution ==
L. pepinosporus is scarcely recorded and little known. The specimens studied by Heinemann were found growing in Zaire, now the Democratic Republic of the Congo. They were collected in Panzi, in the region of Lake Edward and Lake Kivu.
