= Leucocoprinus truncatus =

Scientific classification
- Domain: Eukaryota
- Kingdom: Fungi
- Division: Basidiomycota
- Class: Agaricomycetes
- Order: Agaricales
- Family: Agaricaceae
- Genus: Leucocoprinus
- Species: L. truncatus

Binomial name
- Leucocoprinus truncatus E.Ludw. & P.Mohr (2012)

Synonyms
- Lepiota truncata A.Pearson (1950)

Species of fungus

Leucocoprinus truncatus Mycological characteristics
- Gills on hymenium
- Cap is campanulate or flat
- Hymenium is free
- Stipe has a ring
- Spore print is white
- Ecology is saprotrophic
- Edibility is unknown

Leucocoprinus truncatus is a species of mushroom-producing fungus in the family Agaricaceae.

== Taxonomy ==
It was first described in 1950 from South Africa by Arthur Anselm Pearson who classified it as Lepiota truncata.

In 2012 the German mycologists Erhard Ludwig and Peter Mohr reclassified it as Leucocoprinus truncatus after recording the specimen from an indoor plant pot, this was noted as the first record of the African species in Europe. They suggested the common name of Abgestutzter Faltenschirmling which translates as trimmed or clipped pleated parasol.

== Description ==
Leucocoprinus truncatus is a small white dapperling mushroom with white flesh which does not discolour.

Cap: Starts cylindrical with a flat top or like an 'inverted bucket' before becoming conical and then expanding to up to 1.5 cm wide, campanulate and finally flat convex and is 'rather fleshy'. The cap surface is white at first with a brown centre disc that remains truncate and flattened on the top, the disc breaks up into brown scales which are easily rubbed off to reveal the silky white surface beneath. The cap surface is covered in fine granules or a fine woolly coating (tomentose) and discolours brownish with age or with damage. Stem: Up to 2.5 cm long and 1.5mm thick gradually tapering up from a 4mm wide base. The surface is cream coloured, smooth above the ring but covered in short, fine felty hairs below which can be rubbed off. The base of the stem has some slight brown scales and white mycelium showing. The ascending, membranous stem ring is white but discolours brown with a frayed edge with age and it becomes movable with age. Gills: Free, crowded and whitish at first becoming creamy. Spores: Ovoid to amygdaliform. Dextrinoid and metachromatic. 10-12 x 5.5-6.5 μm.

Also noted is the secretion of light brown droplets or guttation on the cap, stem and ring. Most specimens began to discolour brown, wither and go moldy shortly after maturing.

Pearson's description of Lepiota truncata from 1950 broadly agrees with the description of Leucocoprinus truncatus but contains some additional details not noted in the more recent description. These differences are noted here:

Cap: 1–6 cm wide. The cap edges have striations when old and they often have an appendiculate veil. Stem: 5–6 cm long and 3-5mm thick with a white or pinkish surface. Separable from the cap and solid but hollowing with age. The stem ring is 2-3mm wide and movable, sometimes fragments of it adhere to the cap margins (appendiculate). The position of the ring on the stem is not noted in either description, however accompanying drawings by Mary Maytham Kidd show it toward the top of the cap (superior to apical). Gills: Pearson notes that they have a bulge in the middle (ventricose), are 3-5mm wide with fimbriate edges and that the white surface stains lemon yellow in places. The gills are of several lengths.Spore print: White. Taste: Mild. Smell: None.

== Habitat and distribution ==
The specimens studied by Pearson were found growing in trooping groups near various trees and shrubs in the South-West corner of the former Cape Province of South Africa. They were said to be common during April to June and were also noted as sometimes growing on burnt ground. The specimen studied by Ludwig and Mohr was found in an orchid pot from a bathroom in Europe and was noted as probably the first record of this species from Europe.

GBIF has one recorded observation for this species with a specimen preserved in 2006.

== Etymology ==
The specific epithet truncatus (originally truncata) likely refers to the truncated central disc which this species displays.
