= Leucocoprinus acutoumbonatus =

Scientific classification
- Kingdom: Fungi
- Division: Basidiomycota
- Class: Agaricomycetes
- Order: Agaricales
- Family: Agaricaceae
- Genus: Leucocoprinus
- Species: L. acutoumbonatus

Binomial name
- Leucocoprinus acutoumbonatus T.K.A. Kumar & Manim. (2009)

Species of fungus

Leucocoprinus acutoumbonatus
- Mycological characteristics
- Gills on hymenium
- Cap is convex or campanulate
- Hymenium is free
- Stipe has a ring
- Spore print is white
- Ecology is saprotrophic
- Edibility is unknown

Leucocoprinus acutoumbonatus is a species of mushroom producing fungus in the family Agaricaceae.

== Taxonomy ==
It was first described in 2009 by the Indian mycologists T.K. Arun Kumar & Patinjareveettil Manimohan who classified it as Leucocoprinus acutoumbonatus.

== Description ==
Leucocoprinus acutoumbonatus is a small dapperling mushroom with thin (under 2mm thick) whitish flesh.

Cap: 2-6cm wide with a convex to campanulate (bell shaped) cap when young, expanding to convex, broadly convex and finally conico-campanulate usually with a prominent conical umbo which becomes more pronounced with age. The cap is mostly dull white with yellowish white tones coming through at the cap edges and a brown umbo with woolly (floccose) scales occurring more towards the centre. Striations (sulcate-striate) are present towards the cap edge, which curves inwards when young but straightens as it ages and may develop serrations. Gills: Free and close to crowded at up to 10mm wide, white but discolouring yellowish brown with age. The gill edges are serrated (fimbriate to denticulate). Stem: 3-5.5 cm tall and 3-5mm thick, tapering slightly from the wider base that is up to 10mm and may be surrounded with white mycelium. The outside of the stem is white with a reddish grey tint which discolours greyish brown in age or red to brownish orange when bruised. It has a powdery or silky texture on the outside and the internal flesh is solid when young but becomes fistulose or hollow with age. The membranous, fixed stem ring is located high up the stem (superior) and has dark brown scales (squamules) on the top. The stem flesh discolours to a reddish colour on exposure to air. Spore print: White. Spores: Ovoid or ellipsoid with a truncated base and a germ pore. Dextrinoid. 8-11 x 6-8 μm. Smell: Indistinct.

== Etymology ==
The specific epithet acutoumbonatus is Latin for 'with an acute umbo'.

== Habitat and distribution ==
L. acutoumbonatus is scarcely recorded and little known and may be confused with numerous other red staining Leucocoprinus or Leucoagaricus species. The specimens studied were growing individually or in tufts (caespitose) on the bark of live trees or on rotting wood in the state of Kerala, India.
