= Leucocoprinus tephrolepis =

Scientific classification
- Domain: Eukaryota
- Kingdom: Fungi
- Division: Basidiomycota
- Class: Agaricomycetes
- Order: Agaricales
- Family: Agaricaceae
- Genus: Leucocoprinus
- Species: L. tephrolepis

Binomial name
- Leucocoprinus tephrolepis Justo, Bizzi, Angelini & Vizzini (2020)

Species of fungus

Leucocoprinus tephrolepis Mycological characteristics
- Gills on hymenium
- Cap is campanulate or flat
- Hymenium is free
- Stipe has a ring
- Ecology is saprotrophic
- Edibility is unknown

Leucocoprinus tephrolepis is a species of mushroom producing fungus in the family Agaricaceae.

== Taxonomy ==
It was described in 2020 by mycologists Alfredo Justo, Alberto Bizzi, Angelini Claudio and Alfredo Vizzini who classified it as Leucocoprinus tephrolepis.

== Description ==
Leucocoprinus tephrolepis is a small dapperling mushroom with very thin white flesh.

Cap: 2-2.5 cm wide, starting paraboloid before expanding to conico-canpanulate and finally flattening with age with a depressed center and a small round umbo that is raised up. The surface is white with a sparse coating of ash grey scales which are sparse or absent at the margins but somewhat dense in the centre disc creating a darker spot. The margins have strong sulcate striations that extend around halfway across the cap and the edges may split. The surface remains white with age. Gills: Free, moderately crowded and white but with a pink-orange tinge developing in older specimens or within a few hours of collecting. The edges remain white and are slightly eroded when viewed with a lens. Stem: 2.5–3 cm long and 2-3mm thick cylindrical to clavate tapering upwards from a slightly bulbous base. The surface is whitish, smooth at the apex but with a powdery to fibrous (pruinose-fibrillose) coating towards the base. The stem also discolours to a pink-orange shade. The thin, membranous, ascending stem ring is white but sometimes has grey edges. It is usually found towards the top of the stem (apical to superior). Spores: 5.5-7 x 3-4 μm. Ellipsoid to ovoid without a germ pore, oblong to subcylindrical when viewed from the side. Dextrinoid and metachromatic. Basidia: 11-18 x 6-9 μm. Clavate to spheropedunculate. Four spored. Smell: Fungal or indistinct.

== Etymology ==
The specific epithet tephrolepis derives from the Greek tephrós meaning ash coloured and lepis meaning scale. This is a reference to the colour of the scales on the cap of this species.

== Habitat and distribution ==
The specimens studied were growing gregariously on leaf litter and old termite nests in humid mixed woodland during February to April. As of 2020 it is known only from the Dominican Republic and St. John in the US Virgin Islands.

== Similar species ==
Leucocoprinus tephrolepis is considered part of the Leucocoprinus heinemannii complex which is a collection of similar looking species characterised by dark grey or black scales and a dark centre disc. These species can be very difficult to distinguish based only on macroscopic features and may require microscopic or genetic sequencing. The pink-orange discolouration may help distinguish this species from others.
