= Leucocoprinus subglobisporus =

Scientific classification
- Kingdom: Fungi
- Division: Basidiomycota
- Class: Agaricomycetes
- Order: Agaricales
- Family: Agaricaceae
- Genus: Leucocoprinus
- Species: L. subglobisporus

Binomial name
- Leucocoprinus subglobisporus Hongo (1985)

Species of fungus

Leucocoprinus subglobisporus
- Mycological characteristics
- Gills on hymenium
- Cap is campanulate or depressed
- Hymenium is free
- Stipe has a ring
- Spore print is white
- Ecology is saprotrophic
- Edibility is unknown

Leucocoprinus subglobisporus is a species of mushroom-producing fungus in the family Agaricaceae.

== Taxonomy ==
It was first described in 1985 by the Japanese mycologist Tsuguo Hongo who classified it as Leucocoprinus subglobisporus.

== Description ==
Leucocoprinus subglobisporus is a small delicate mushroom with a very thin and fragile white flesh.

Cap: 1.8-2.5cm wide, ovoid or campanulate (bell shaped) and then flattening or depressing with age with a slight raised umbo in the centre. The surface is white and covered in tiny pale greyish-red floccose (woolly) scales which are a darker brownish-red towards and at the centre of the cap. The cap edges are scaly with striations and furrows. Gills: Free, subdistant and white. Stem: 2.5-6cm long and 1.5-2.5mm thick tapering slightly from the thicker base. The surface is white and silky with a very fine powdery coating whilst the interior is hollow. The white, membranous stem ring is movable and narrow. Smell: Indistinct. Spores: Ovoid or subglobose with a narrow germ pore. 6.7-9.7 x 5-7.5μm.

== Habitat and distribution ==
L. subglobisporus is scarcely recorded and little known. The specimens studied by Hongo were found growing on a refuse heap in Ōtsu in the Shiga prefecture or Japan.

== Similar species ==
- Leucocoprinus lilacinogranulosus is noted as appearing similar but is distinguished by differences in the spore shape. However this species has since been reclassified as Leucocoprinus ianthinus.
