= Leucocoprinus delicatulus =

Scientific classification
- Kingdom: Fungi
- Division: Basidiomycota
- Class: Agaricomycetes
- Order: Agaricales
- Family: Agaricaceae
- Genus: Leucocoprinus
- Species: L. delicatulus

Binomial name
- Leucocoprinus delicatulus T.K.A. Kumar & Manim. (2009)

Species of fungus

Leucocoprinus delicatulus
- Mycological characteristics
- Gills on hymenium
- Cap is convex or flat
- Hymenium is free
- Stipe has a ring
- Spore print is white
- Ecology is saprotrophic
- Edibility is unknown

Leucocoprinus delicatulus is a species of mushroom producing fungus in the family Agaricaceae.

== Taxonomy ==
It was first described in 2009 by the Indian mycologists T.K. Arun Kumar & Patinjareveettil Manimohan who classified it as Leucocoprinus delicatulus.

== Description ==
Leucocoprinus delicatulus is a small dapperling mushroom with thin (up to 1mm thick) whitish flesh.

Cap: 1-4.1cm wide with a white and grey convex cap which may flatten with age. It is covered in scales (squamules) which are sparse at the edge of the cap and concentrated more towards the disc. It is striate towards the edges of the cap which curves inward at first and later flattens or erodes. Gills: Free, crowded and whitish. Stem: 4.5-6cm tall and 1-2mm thick expanding to up to 5mm at the base where there is white mycelium. The exterior of the hollow stem is whitish and discolours to greyish brown with age or from bruising. The membranous, ascending stem ring is persistent and can be located in the middle of the stem or towards the top or bottom. Spore print: White. Spores: Ellipsoid or subamygdaliform with a thick wall and truncate germ pore. Hyaline with guttules. Dextrinoid, metachromatic and cyanophilic. 9-12 x 6-7 μm. Basidia: 16-24 x 11-21 μm. Smell: Indistinct.

== Etymology ==
The specific epithet delicatulus is Latin for 'delicate'.

== Habitat and distribution ==
L. delicatulus is scarcely recorded and little known and may be confused with numerous other Leucocoprinus or Leucoagaricus species. The specimens studied were growing individually or scattered amongst decaying leaf litter in the state of Kerala, India.

== Similar species ==
- Leucocoprinus ianthinus is very similar in appearance and is distinguished via microscopic differences.
