= Leucocoprinus acer =

Scientific classification
- Kingdom: Fungi
- Division: Basidiomycota
- Class: Agaricomycetes
- Order: Agaricales
- Family: Agaricaceae
- Genus: Leucocoprinus
- Species: L. acer

Binomial name
- Leucocoprinus acer Raithelh. (1988)

Species of fungus

Leucocoprinus acer Mycological characteristics
- Gills on hymenium
- Cap is convex
- Hymenium is free or sinuate
- Stipe has a ring
- Ecology is saprotrophic
- Edibility is unknown

Leucocoprinus acer is a species of mushroom producing fungus in the family Agaricaceae.

== Taxonomy ==
It was first described in 1988 by the mycologist Jörg Raithelhuber who classified it as Leucocoprinus acer.

== Description ==
Leucocoprinus acer is a small white dapperling mushroom. Raithelhuber only described the species from a dried specimen and an illustration deposited at the herbarium of the University of Buenos Aires a decade earlier so the description may be incomplete.

Cap: 1.5-2.5 cm wide when mature, it starts hemispherical before expanding to convex. The surface is very pale, whitish with a shiny (micante), powdery (pruinose) coating whilst the centre disc has a pale red ochre colour (described as 'sinopicus' in the Latin description which refers to the pigment from Sinop, Turkey) or light chestnut brown in the German description. Stem: 3.5-4.5 cm long and 2-4mm thick with a base that is not bulbous or only slightly bulbous, cylindrical. The Latin diagnosis describes the surface as pale (presumably whitish though not explicitly specified) with a red ochre colour at the base whilst the German only says that the stem is light chestnut brown. A stem ring is present and 'distinct' but no further details are supplied. Gills: White, moderately crowded (subconfertae) with the attachment described as sinuate to subfree. This would be unusual for a Leucocoprinus species as they are typically free with a collar. Spores: Subglobose or ovoid, smooth with an indistinct germ pore that is not detectable in some spores. Weakly dextrinoid. 8.8-10 x 6.5-7.2 μm. Cystidia: Claviform or truncated. Taste: bitter.

Since many Leucocoprinus species can exhibit a change of colour when dry and as no fresh material was examined to describe this species it is possible that this species may present with different colouration when fresh.

== Etymology ==
The specific epithet acer is Latin for bitter and the species is presumably named for the taste noted in the description, however a bitter taste is not unique to this Leucocoprinus species.

== Habitat and distribution ==
The specimens studied by Raithelhuber were found in Temperley, a district in Greater Buenos Aires, Argentina in 1972. They were observed to be growing in large groups in the morning.
