= Leucocoprinus munnarensis =

Scientific classification
- Kingdom: Fungi
- Division: Basidiomycota
- Class: Agaricomycetes
- Order: Agaricales
- Family: Agaricaceae
- Genus: Leucocoprinus
- Species: L. munnarensis

Binomial name
- Leucocoprinus munnarensis T.K.A. Kumar & Manim. (2009)

Species of fungus

Leucocoprinus munnarensis
- Mycological characteristics
- Gills on hymenium
- Cap is convex or flat
- Hymenium is free
- Stipe has a ring
- Spore print is white
- Ecology is saprotrophic
- Edibility is unknown

Leucocoprinus munnarensis is a species of mushroom producing fungus in the family Agaricaceae.

== Taxonomy ==
It was first described in 2009 by the Indian mycologists T.K. Arun Kumar & Patinjareveettil Manimohan who classified it as Leucocoprinus munnarensis.

== Description ==
Leucocoprinus munnarensis is a small dapperling mushroom with thin (up to 1mm thick) whitish flesh which discolours brown.

Cap: 2.7-5.1cm wide with a white, convex cap which may flatten with age. It is covered in scattered fine dark grey or blackish scales (squamules) which are sparse at the edge of the cap and concentrated more towards the umbonate centre disc. It is striate towards the edges of the cap which curves inward at first and later flattens or erodes. Gills: Free, crowded and whitish. Stem: 5-8cm tall and 3-5mm thick expanding to up to 5mm at the base where there is white mycelium. The exterior of the stem is whitish and discolours to brown with damage or contact and the interior hollows with age. The membranous stem ring is located towards the top of the stem (superior) and may disappear. Spores: Amygdaliform with a germ pore. Dextrinoid. 8.5-12.5 x 6-8 μm. Smell: Indistinct.

== Etymology ==
The specific epithet munnarensis is named for the town of Munnar in the Indian state of Kerala where this species was observed.

== Habitat and distribution ==
L. munnarensis is scarcely recorded, little known and may be confused with numerous other Leucocoprinus or Leucoagaricus species. The specimens studied were growing individually or scattered on soil in the state of Kerala, India.

== Similar species ==
- Leucocoprinus brebissonii is similar in appearance and is distinguished via the lack of brown bruising as well as microscopic differences.
