= Rose Marie Dähncke =

German botanist and mycologist

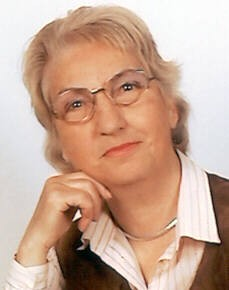
- Rose Marie Dähncke
- Born: Rose Marie Kerszebinsky; 10 February 1925 (age 101); Lübeck, Germany
- Occupation: Scientist
- Writing career
- Notable work: Mycology

Rose Marie Dähncke (born 10 February 1925) is a German mycologist, and popular author of books on foraging and cooking with foraged foods. She is known for studying the mushrooms of La Palma. She has described at least 14 species of fungi, including several in the genera Cystoderma and Lyophyllum. The standard author abbreviation Dähncke is used to indicate this person as the author when citing a botanical name.

== Scientific works ==
- Dähncke, Rose Marie; Contu, Marco; Vizzini, Alfredo (2011). "Two new species of Lyophyllum s.l. (Basidiomycota, Agaricomycetes) from La Palma (Canary Islands, Spain)". Mycotaxon. 115 (1): 65–71. doi:10.5248/115.65. hdl:2318/81502. ISSN 0093-4666. OCLC 6792718704.
- Marie Dähncke, Rose; Contu, Marco; Vizzini, Alfredo (2010). "New taxa in the genus Lyophyllum s.l. from La Palma (Canary Islands, Spain)". Mycotaxon. 111 (1): 323–330. doi:10.5248/111.323. hdl:2318/73428. ISSN 0093-4666. OCLC 607701114.
- Vizzini, Alfredo; Dähncke, Rose Marie; Contu, Marco (2011). "Clitopilus canariensis (Basidiomycota, Entolomataceae), a new species in the C. nitellinus-complex (Clitopilus subg. Rhodophana) from the Canary Islands (Spain)". Brittonia. 63 (4): 484–488. doi:10.1007/s12228-011-9187-z. hdl:2318/81919. ISSN 0007-196X. OCLC 7788379793. S2CID 2888444.

== Popular identification works and cookbooks ==
- Dähncke, Rose Marie (2009). 1200 Pilze in Farbfotos (in German). AT-Verl. ISBN 9783038004851. OCLC 436295696.
- Dähncke, Rose Marie (1980). Wie erkenne ich die Pilze: Einführung in die Pilzkunde für Speisepilzsammler und Botaniker (in German). AT Verl. ISBN 9783855020393. OCLC 716698333.
- Dähncke, Rose Marie (1998). Las setas: die pilze en La Palma. Excmo. Cabildo Insular de la Palma. ISBN 9788487664113. OCLC 183078067.
- Dähncke, Rose Marie; Cyrot, Janine; Dähncke, Sabine Maria (1981). Les Baies: comment déterminer correctement les baies comestibles et les baies toxiques (in French). F. Nathan. ISBN 9782092783054. OCLC 29993311.
- Dähncke, Rose Marie; Dähncke, Sabine Maria (1984). Schlemmereien aus Wald und Wiese: Wildkräuter, Beeren, Nüsse und Pilze leicht erkennen und schmackhaft zubereiten (in German). AT Verlag. ISBN 9783855020546. OCLC 613249032.
