= Helen Vandervort Smith =

American botanist and paleobotanist (1909–1995)

Helen Vandervort Smith (March 3, 1909 – August 3, 1995) was an American botanist, known for her work on wildflowers and mushrooms.

== Biography ==
Helen Vandervort Smith was born to Orma and Ora Smith in Jamestown, Ohio, in 1909. As a young child, she moved with her family to the area of Caldwell, Idaho, where she grew up.

Smith obtained a bachelor's in English from the College of Idaho in 1930. She then graduated with a master's degree from the University of Oregon in 1932, focusing her research on fossil plants from Succor Creek. From 1932 to 1940, she studied at the University of Michigan, obtaining a doctorate in botany in 1940. Her doctoral research focused on fossil plants in Idaho's Thorn Creek.

As her career progressed, she went on to research wildflowers and mushrooms. In 1961, she published the book Michigan Wildflowers. Also a watercolor painter, she produced various illustrations of North American mushrooms and other flora.

Smith was also active in land conservation efforts in Michigan.

She married mycologist Alexander H. Smith in 1936, and the couple often collaborated professionally, including on two illustrated books about mushrooms.

In 1995, at age 86, she died in Corvallis, Oregon, where she had moved in her later years. A wildflower garden at the University of Michigan's Matthaei Botanical Gardens was named in Smith's honor.
