= Leucocoprinus breviramus =

Scientific classification
- Domain: Eukaryota
- Kingdom: Fungi
- Division: Basidiomycota
- Class: Agaricomycetes
- Order: Agaricales
- Family: Agaricaceae
- Genus: Leucocoprinus
- Species: L. breviramus

Binomial name
- Leucocoprinus breviramus H.V. Sm. & N.S. Weber (1982)

Species of fungus

Leucocoprinus breviramus Mycological characteristics
- Gills on hymenium
- Cap is conical or campanulate
- Hymenium is free
- Stipe has a ring
- Spore print is white
- Ecology is saprotrophic
- Edibility is unknown

Leucocoprinus breviramus is a species of mushroom producing fungus in the family Agaricaceae.

== Taxonomy ==
It was first described in 1982 by the mycologists Helen Vandervort Smith and Nancy S. Weber who classified it as Leucocoprinus breviramus. The specimens studied and documented were collected by Ervin Hillhouse in 1971.

== Description ==
Leucocoprinus breviramus is a small dapperling mushroom with white flesh.

Cap: 3.5–9 cm wide. Starts bulbous and expands to conical or campanulate (bell shaped) and finally flattens out or becomes concave with the cap edges lifting up in maturity. The surface is snow white with a slight yellowish brown tinge in the centre. It is covered with small woolly scales (floccules) which are denser and finer in the centre becoming sparser towards the cap edges, these scales easily rub off and cover the fingers. The striations at the cap margins are only visible when mature. The cap flesh is white and thin (3-4mm) near the stem and thins out more towards the cap edges. Stem: 5.5-8.0 cm long and 3-5mm thick at the top tapering to 10-12mm at the bulbous base. The surface is white and sometimes stains slightly yellow when handled whilst the interior may be hollow, filled or solid. It is covered with similar woolly scales to the cap below the stem ring but is smooth above. The small, white stem ring is located towards the top of the stem (superior) but it usually disappears and may just leave small traces on the stem. Gills: White, crowded and free. Spores: Ovate to elliptical with a small pore. Dextrinoid. 7.5-9.0 (10) x 5.5-6.5 μm. Smell: Slightly musky. Taste: Mild when raw and similar to button mushrooms when cooked.

In Weber's book 'A Field Guide to Southern Mushrooms' a photograph of this species is included however it appears to be a photo of Leucocoprinus cretaceus so this species may by synonymous considering the very similar description.

== Habitat and distribution ==
L. breviramus is scarcely recorded and little known. The specimens studied were gathered in Brazoria county, Texas in 1971 and Washington county, Mississippi in 1979. The mushrooms were reported as fruiting singly or sometimes in small clusters on grass and on wet hay in the Summer and Autumn. They were reported as appearing most prominently during dry summers and appearing a few days after rain.

== Edibility ==
The species is reported to be edible without ill effects even when eaten in large quantities and described as very good, however this report comes from a single individual so should not be relied upon as an indication of safety.

== Similar species ==
- Leucocoprinus cepistipes appears similar but L. breviramus is distinguished from it by its pure white appearance and the cap striations which only appear at the cap edges as well as the persistent floccules at the centre of the cap. Additionally the tendency to grow individually rather than in tufts helps distinguish L. breviramus.
- Leucocoprinus cretaceus fruits in large clusters and has larger spores.
