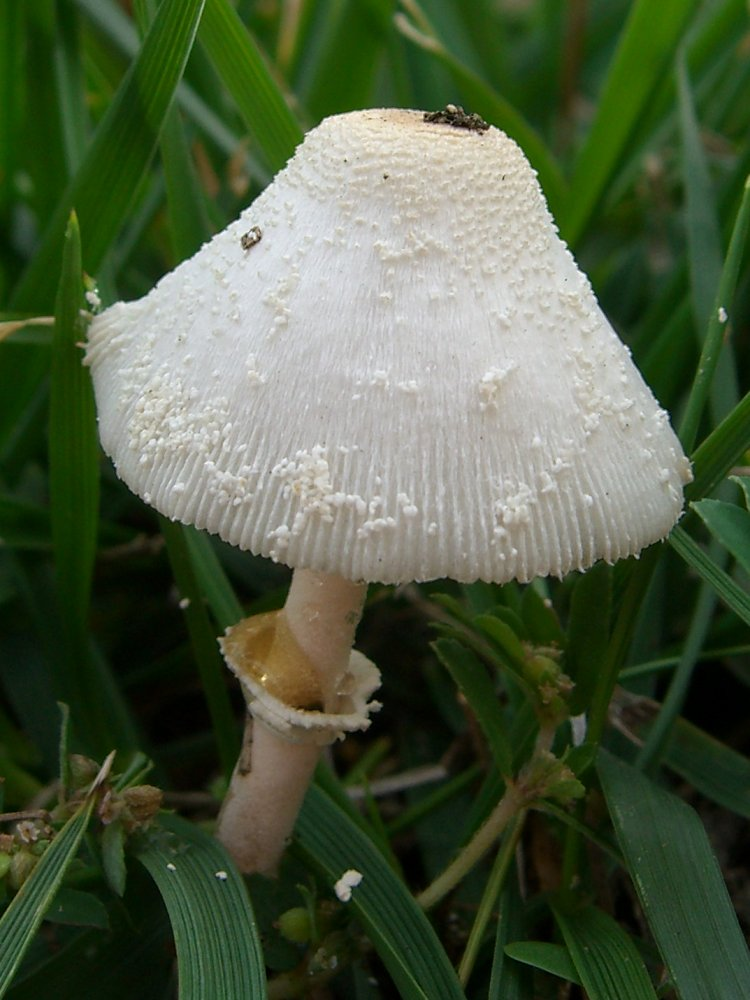

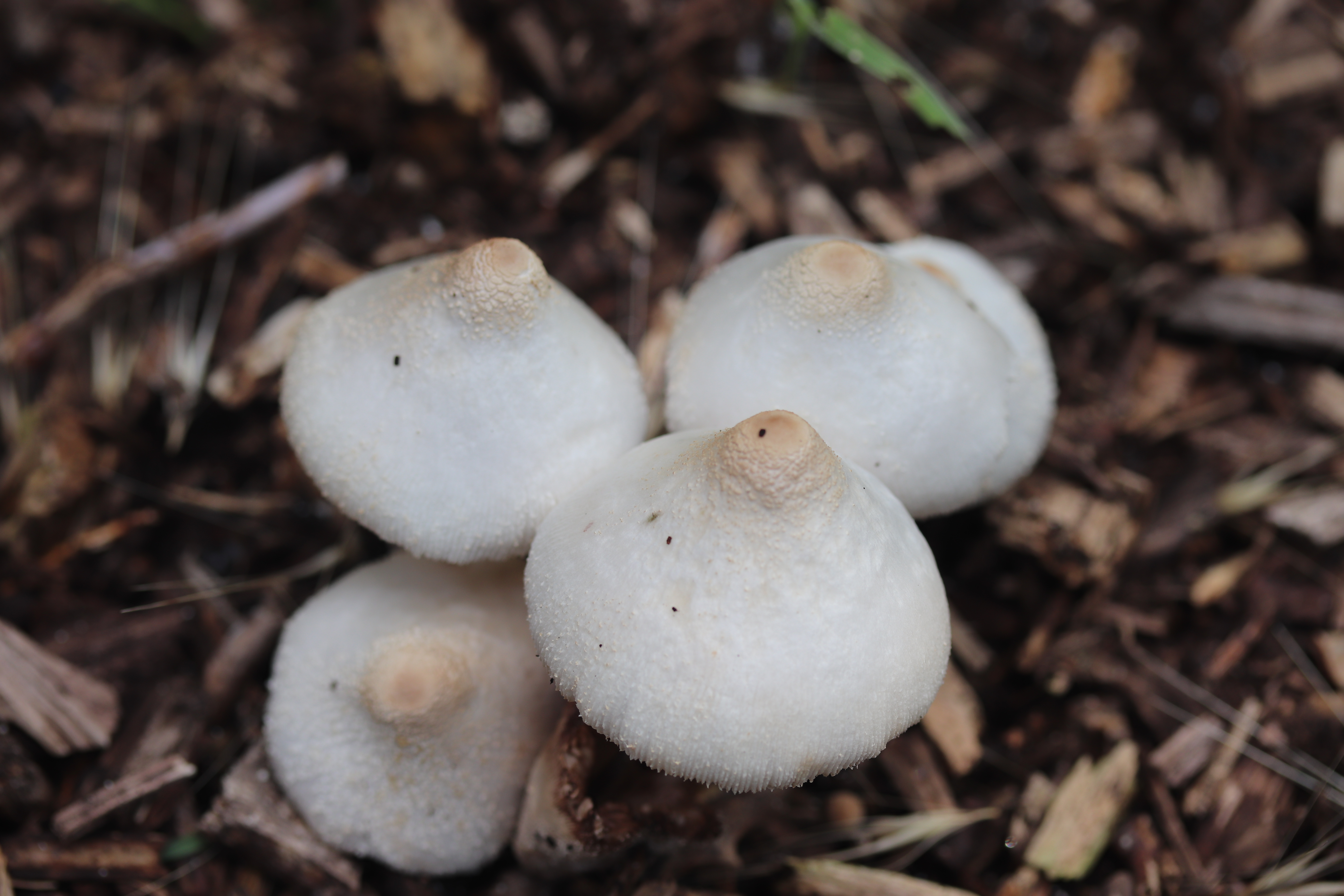

Scientific classification
- Domain: Eukaryota
- Kingdom: Fungi
- Division: Basidiomycota
- Class: Agaricomycetes
- Order: Agaricales
- Family: Agaricaceae
- Genus: Leucocoprinus
- Species: L. cepistipes

Binomial name
- Leucocoprinus cepistipes (Sowerby) Pat. (1889)

Synonyms
- Agaricus cepistipes Sowerby (1796); Coprinus cepistipes Gray (1821); Lepiota cepistipes P. Kumm. (1871); Mastocephalus cepistipes Kuntze (1891); Hiatula cepistipes R. Heim & Romagn. (1934); Leucoagaricus cepistipes De Leon, Kalaw, Dulay, Undan, Alfonzo, Undan & Reyes (2016); Agaricus praealtus J.F. Gmel. (1792); Lepiota cepistipes var. praealta Sacc & Traverso (1910); Agaricus luteus With. (1796); Agaricus cepistipes var. luteus Pers. (1801); Lepiota cepistipes var. lutea Quél. (1886); Sclerotium mycetospora Nees ex Fr. (1822); Agaricus rorulentus Panizzi (1862); Lepiota rorulenta Sacc (1887); Mastocephalus rorulentus Kuntze (1891); Lepiota cepistipes var. rorulenta Rick (1961); Leucocoprinus cepistipes var. rorulentus Babos (1980); Agaricus sordescens Berk & M.A. Curtis (1868); Lepiota sordescens Sacc (1887); Mastocephalus sordescens Kuntze (1891); Lepiota cepistipes var. sordescens Rick (1961); Agaricus cheimonoceps Berk & M.A. Curtis (1868); Lepiota cheimonoceps Sacc (1887); Mastocephalus cheimonoceps Kuntze (1891); Lepiota cepistipes var. cheimonoceps Rick (1961); Leucocoprinus cheimonoceps Singer (1986); Agaricus cepistipes var. nigrescens Bagl. (1886); Lepiota cepistipes var. hiatuloides Rick (1961); Leucocoprinus cepistipes var. hiatuloides Raithelh. (1987); Leucocoprinus cepistipes f. macrosporus Migl. (1986); Leucocoprinus cepistipes var. pseudofarinosus Raithelh. (2004)

= Leucocoprinus cepistipes =

Species of fungus

Leucocoprinus cepistipes Mycological characteristics
- Gills on hymenium
- Cap is convex or umbonate
- Hymenium is free
- Stipe has a ring
- Spore print is white
- Ecology is saprotrophic
- Edibility is not recommended

Leucocoprinus cepistipes (often spelled cepaestipes), is a species of fungus in the family Agaricaceae. It is also known by the common name onion-stalk parasol in reference to the bulbous stem base.

Typical characteristics include a fine-scaled bell-shaped cap, a partial veil, and a tendency to bruise a yellow to brown when handled. It is typically found on wood debris, such as wood chips, but may also grow in potted plants or greenhouses.

== Taxonomy ==
It was first described in 1796 by the English naturalist James Sowerby who classified it as Agaricus cepistipes or 'cepaestipes'. Sowerby's observations of this species were made in bark beds around London where he described its presence as 'not uncommon'. Leucocoprinus species are not native to England but were introduced to greenhouses when tropical plants were brought back by explorers. Sowerby thought that Bulliard's Leucocoprinus cretaceus was the same species since white Leucocoprinus species can look very similar, especially when comparing only illustrations and descriptions in text. However he also considered that the yellow Leucocoprinus birnbaumii, then known as Agaricus luteus was 'undoubtedly the same species', only differing in colour. So whilst his illustration is intricately drawn and coloured it rather confusingly has the yellow and white species side by side.

Sowerby doesn't explicitly state that the observations were made in greenhouses however he does note that the yellow mushrooms were observed at Sir Abraham Hume's Wormleybury manor. During this period exotic plants from the East Indies and India were being cultivated in greenhouses and stove-heated hothouses at Wormleybury making it likely that this is where the mushrooms were found. This may give an indication as to where the fungi observed originated from.

English botanist William Withering disagreed with Sowerby's assumption that all three species were the same and thought that A. cepaestipes and A. cretaceus were the same species but that A. Luteus must be different.

In 1821 the British botanist and mycologist Samuel Frederick Gray classified the species as Coprinus cepaestipes in his book titled 'A Natural Arrangement of British Plants'. Gray suggested the common name of 'onion-stalked dung-stool'. However his description was again conflating this species with L. birnbaumii and referred to the mushroom as entirely yellow. Leucocoprinus cretaceus, then known as Agaricus cretaceus was simply described as entirely white. The confusion between these species is seen again in 1843 when Miles Joseph Berkeley described an observation of Agaricus (Lepiota) cepaestipes from Oeiras, Piauhy, Brazil in which the specimens are described as sulphur yellow. Berkeley described it as very closely resembling Jens Wilken Hornemann's illustration of Agaricus cepaestipes from Flora Danica however this illustration is without colour and the accompanying description only mentions pale gills. Berkeley may have actually been observing Leucocoprinus birnbaumii or other yellow species found in Brazil such as Leucocoprinus brunneoluteus.

In 1871 the German botanist Otto Kuntze classified the species as Lepiota cepaestipes in his book titled 'Der Führer in die Pilzkunde' or 'The Guide to Mycology'. Kuntze appears to have been correctly describing L. cretaceus as he noted that the specimen had a white cap and stem with a hollow stem ring which quickly disappeared. He stated that the mushrooms grew in large numbers in gardens and greenhouses but not too often. He described the base of the mushroom as 'Zwiebelfuß' or 'onion-footed' referring to the bulbous base which is common amongst Leucocoprinus species.

In the same year the British mycologists Miles Joseph Berkeley & Christopher Edmund Broome wrote of L. cepaestipes specimens found amongst decayed herbs. They were described as 'densely clustered, of a beautiful yellow, base of stipes tinged with orange.' They also commented about these mushrooms being the same as ones found occasionally in their hothouses.

Over the centuries it has been classified numerous times or merged with other classified observations which were found to be the same species so this mushroom has many synonyms but few which are ever used today.

In 1889 it was reclassified as Leucocoprinus cepistipes by the French mycologist Narcisse Théophile Patouillard. The specimens studied were collected in March and April 1889 from the Caribbean island of Martinique having been found on an old rotten coconut tree trunk.

In 1883 the English botanist and mycologist Mordecai Cubitt Cooke produced illustrations of Agaricus (Lepiota) cepaestipes in his book entitled 'Illustrations of British Fungi'. The mushrooms were described as growing in greenhouses. Cooke likewise appeared to conflate numerous species with side by side drawings of both yellow and white species considered as one.

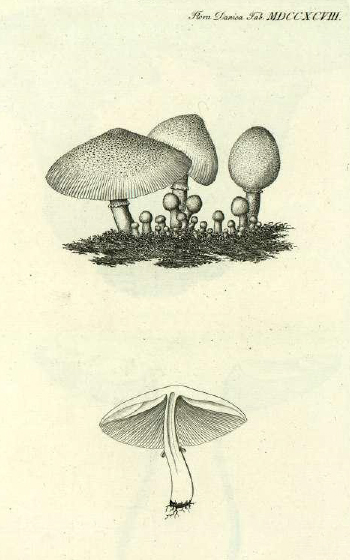
Jens Wilken Hornemann's illustration, 1819 – 1823

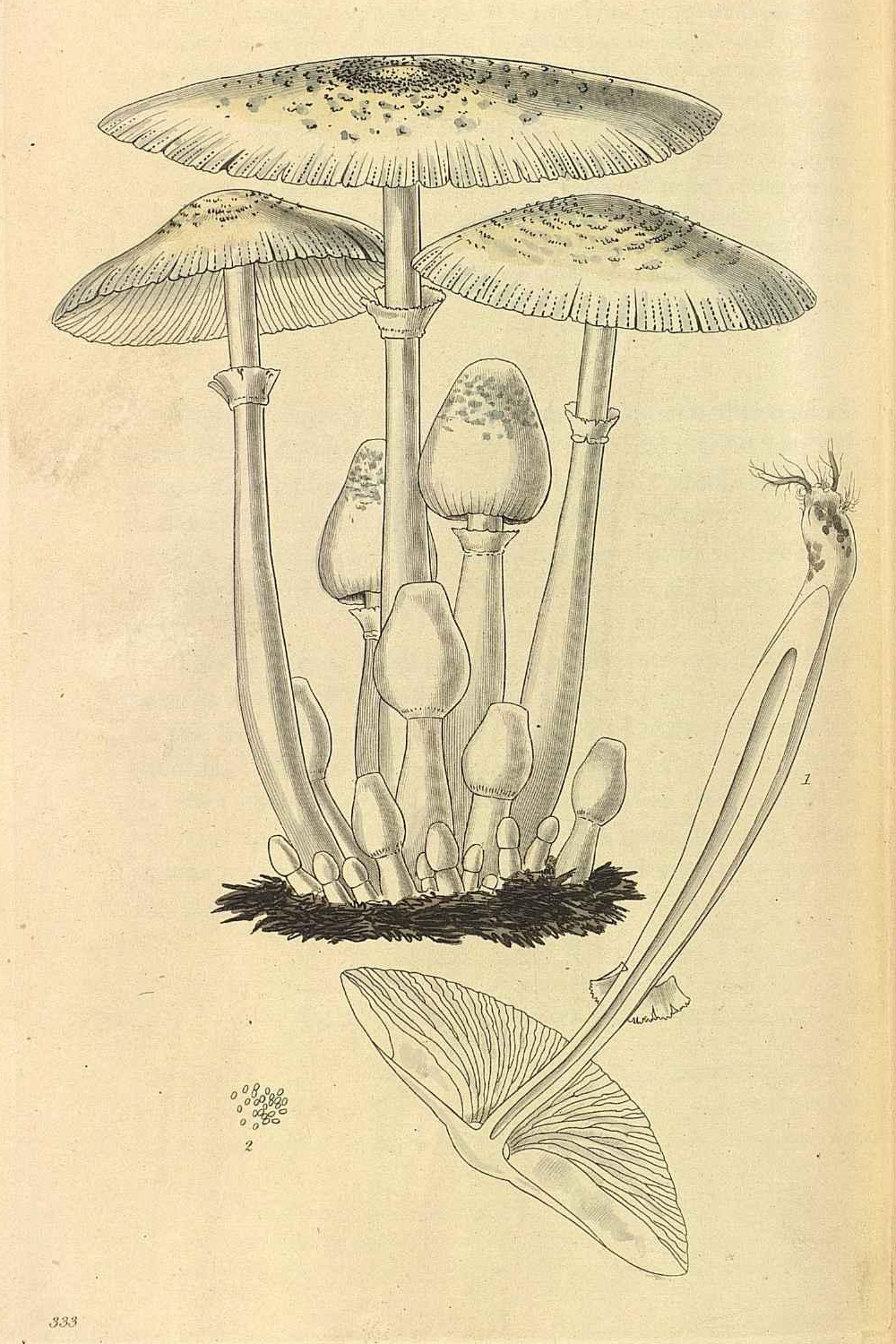
Robert Kaye Greville's illustration, 1828

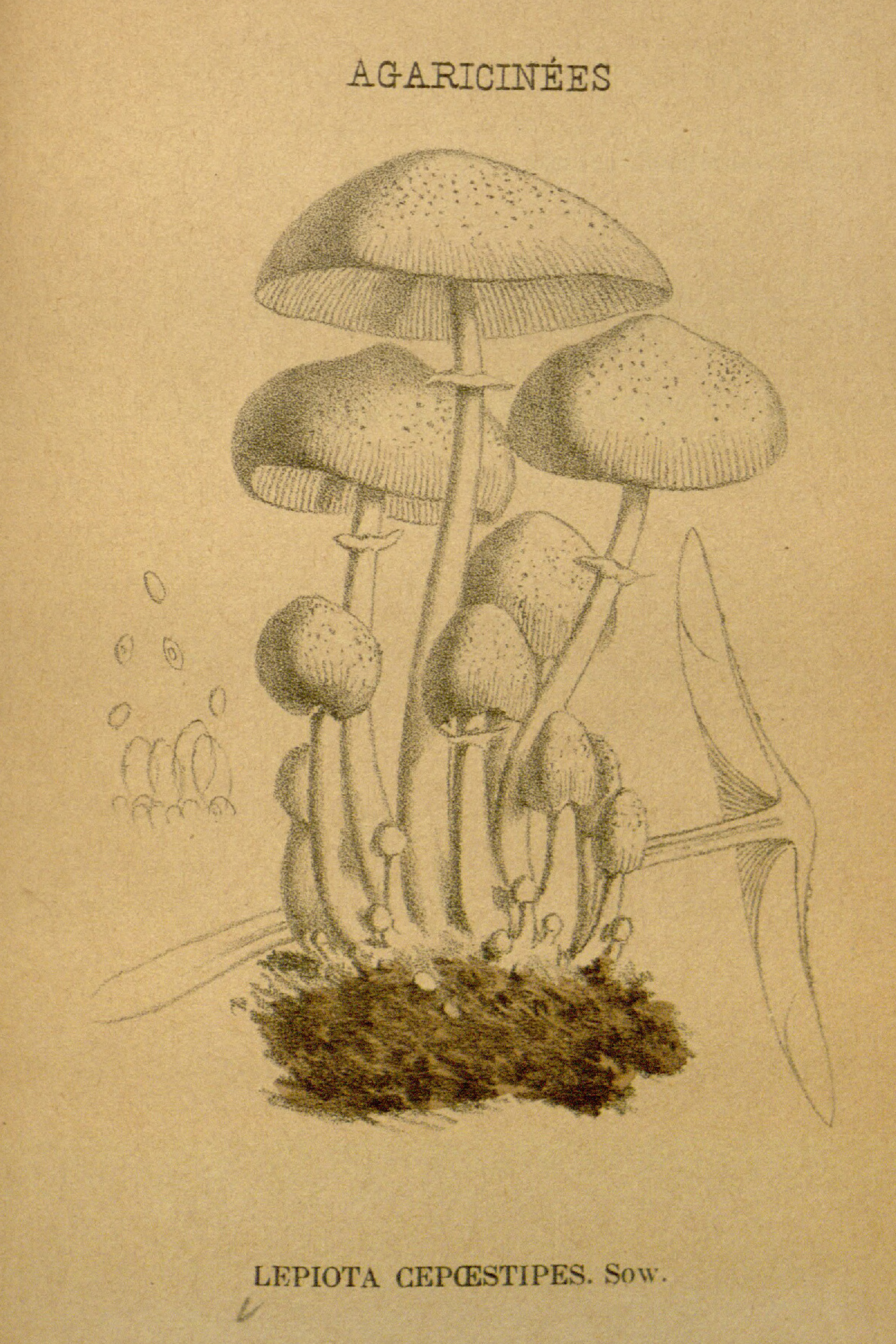
Claude-Casimir Gillet's illustration, 1874–1898

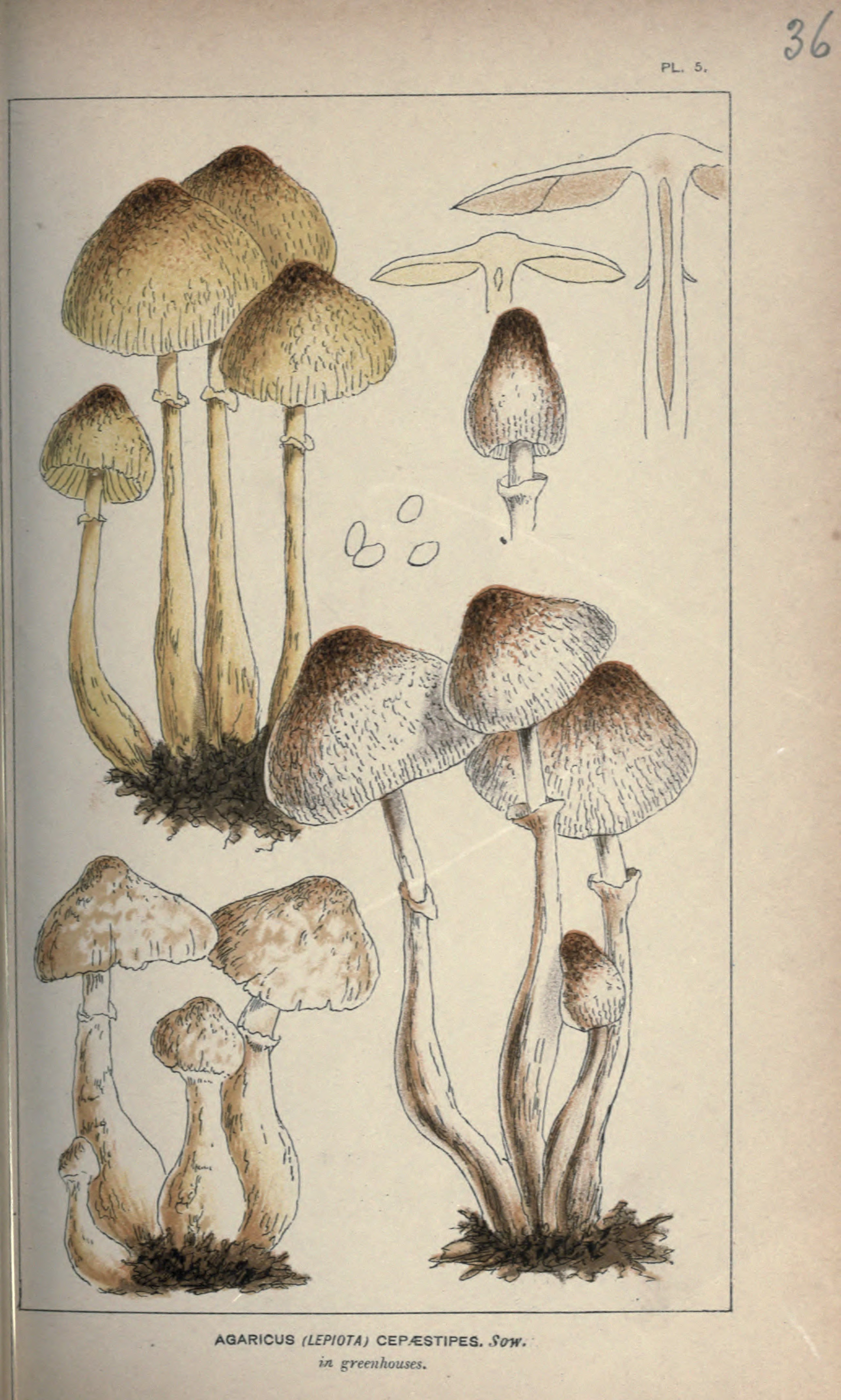
M.C.Cooke's illustration, 1881 – 1891

=== Etymology ===
The specific epithet cepistipes (originally cepaestipes) is derived from the Latin cepae meaning onions whilst stipes means stalk or stem so 'onion stem'. This is a reference to the bulbous base of Leucocoprinus species which may look reminiscent to the bulb of a small onion.

== Description ==
Leucocoprinus cepistipes is a small dapperling mushroom with white flesh.

Cap: 3–9 cm. Bulbous when immature becoming convex with a pronounced umbo which may be darker in the centre against the white colour of the rest of the cap. Stem: 6–9 cm in height. 4-10mm thick. Slightly bulbous at the base with a stem ring which may quickly disappear. May discolour slightly yellow or pinkish brown. Gills: White, sometimes discolouring to pinkish brown with age. Free and crowded. Spore print: White. Spores: Ellipsoid and smooth with a tiny pore. Dextrinoid.7–11 x 4–7 μm. Smell: Indistinct.

Cap: 3–6.5 cm wide when expanded. Starts paraboloid before expanding to campanulate and then flattening. When immature the surface is brown with brown scales more densely clustered towards the centre but as it expands the surface becomes white or creamy coloured with the brown colour only remaining at the centre. There is yellow bruising when touched and sulcate striations are present at the margins. Stem: 3–13 cm long and 2.5-5mm thick becoming wider at the base and tapering upwards with a hollow interior. The surface has a dense, fine pubescent coating all over and is white when immature becoming cream to brownish-cream coloured with age. It bruises yellow when young and yellow-brown to brown when the mature stem is damaged. Clear drops are exuded when immature and may coat the surface. The ascending stem ring is white when young with yellow exudation and some thick scales at the margin similar to those of the cap however it is evanescent and may disappear. Small scales are present on the stem below the annulus. Gills: Crowded, free and remote from the stem with a collar. They are cream to a pale brownish cream colour but discolour brown with age retaining a white fimbriate or floccose edge when viewed with a lens. Flesh: White in the cap and stem of young specimens, cream coloured with age. Smell: Fruity or soapy when cut, or similar to Lepiota cristata. Taste: Rubbery. Spore print: White. Spores: 7.5 – 13 x 6–8 μm or 8.5–11.1 x 6.6–7.5 μm on average. Ellipsoid, oblong or amygdaliform in side view and ellipsoid to oblong face on. They have a thick wall with germ pore. Dextrinoid, congophilous and cyanophilous. Has a pink inner wall when mounted in Cresyl blue. Basidia: 16–37 x 8–12 μm. 4 spored or rarely 2 spored. Cheilocystidia: 25–60 x 8–15 μm. Clavate, lageniform.

=== Leucocoprinus cepistipes f. macrosporus ===
This form was described by the Italian mycologist Vincenzo Migliozzi in 1986 after specimens were found growing in flower pots in Rome, Italy during July and August 1985. They were growing in groups of between three and six specimens. It is described as follows:

Cap: 2–3 cm wide or up to 3.5 cm in larger specimens, starting campanulate before expanding to hemispherical and sometimes flattening out. It lacks striations when immature but develops marked striations of at least 1 cm long at the margins when mature and this characteristic remains when the mushrooms are dried. The margin only occasionally has sparse flaky veil remnants, usually lacking them. The surface is white becoming dirty white with age with a slight tendency towards greying and as the surface mottles with age, concentric fissures develop that expose the cleaner white flesh beneath. The centre disc has a cream-brown colour at all stages but does not develop to become distinctly umbonate and remains mostly flat. The cap surface and flesh sometimes develop colours ranging from dark grey to light olive, contrasting the rest of the surface with a weak grey colour. Stem: Up to 8 cm tall and 3-5mm thick with a wider, somewhat club shaped base and hollow interior. The surface is smooth and has a tendency to discolour yellow or brown when handled or may discolour yellowish with age. It has a simple ring which detaches easily leaving no trace behind. Clear guttation can be present on the stem above the ring or on the immature gills but was not observed simultaneously on both. Gills: Free and crowded, starting white and yellowing slightly with age. Sometimes very slight flesh colour tones are perceptible. Flesh: Pure white to milky white sometimes developing a grey colour. It shows no reaction with ammonia. Taste: Bitter. Smell: Mushroomy. Spores: 10–14 (14.5) x 6–7.5 μm or on average 12.6 x 7 μm. Sub-ellipsoid to amygdaliform with a germ pore and slight nipple-like top. Dextrinoid, metachromatic in Cresyl blue, single vacuole visible inside spore in water. Basidia: 23–36 x 11–13μm. Four spored, spheropedunculate. Cheilocystidia: 50–75 (85) x 12–18 (22) μm. Lageniform. Abundant.

Migliozzi also notes that the gills have curious colour changes when dry which may be more noticeable with this form. If the mushroom dries in situ the gills discolour to dirty white or a light yellow whereas if the mushroom is picked, especially when immature and left to dry elsewhere, the gills develop a slightly pinkish or pinkish brown colour eventually discolouring to brownish.

=== Leucocoprinus cepistipes var. rorulentus ===
This variant was described by the Hungarian mycologist Margit Babos in 1980 and was a reclassification of Agaricus rorulentus as described by Francesco Panizzi in 1862. The specimens studied by Panizzi were found growing on tanbark and were described as differing from Agaricus cepaestipes (now Leucocoprinus cepistipes) due to the convex cup shaped cap that only rarely flattened when mature and smaller central disc. He noted the thin and smooth stem white stem with 'very numerous droplets of an aqueous silver, as if it were sprinkled with dew'. Also noting the ochra colour of the mature stem with a pink shade to the upper portion and stating that it was only just thicker than a writing pen so seemed to be hardly able to support the cap.

Babos described it in more detail from specimens found growing in sawdust around several sawdust plants in Hungary:

Cap: 2–7 cm wide, campanulate and expanding with age but often deforming due to the dense caespitose growth. The surface starts white or dirty greyish with a pale cream-brown (isabell colour) centre that is smooth and matte, as it matures the surface whitens whilst the centre becomes more brownish or creamy brown. The surface is covered with scales (squamules) which are white or tinted the same colour as the centre of the cap. The margins are not striated when immature but develop them with age and may be prone to splitting. Stem: 3–16 cm long and 2-7mm thick, curved and with a thicker clavate base white where rhizoids may be present. The surface is white at first and may remain whitish or turn to a fleshy rose colour. It is covered with a white pruinescence. The ring is white and often leaves remnants on the cap margins. Gills: Free and remote from the stem, crowded with few partial gills. They are white when young but discolour to a dirty rose colour to pale olive-green, greyish-green or brownish. Dried specimens have dark shades. Flesh: White, thin and fragile in the cap. The stem flesh has loose white fibrils inside and a rose tint in the outer flesh of the stem. Taste: Slightly bitter. Spores: 7.5–10.9 (11.7) x 6.2–7.8 (8.5) μm. Ellipsoid or ovoid with a germ pore. Tinted rose. Metachromatic in Cresyl blue. Basidia: 15.6–23 (26) x 7.8–10.1 (11.7) μm. Four spored. Cheilocystidia: (30) 40–62 x (7.8) 11–16 (−18)

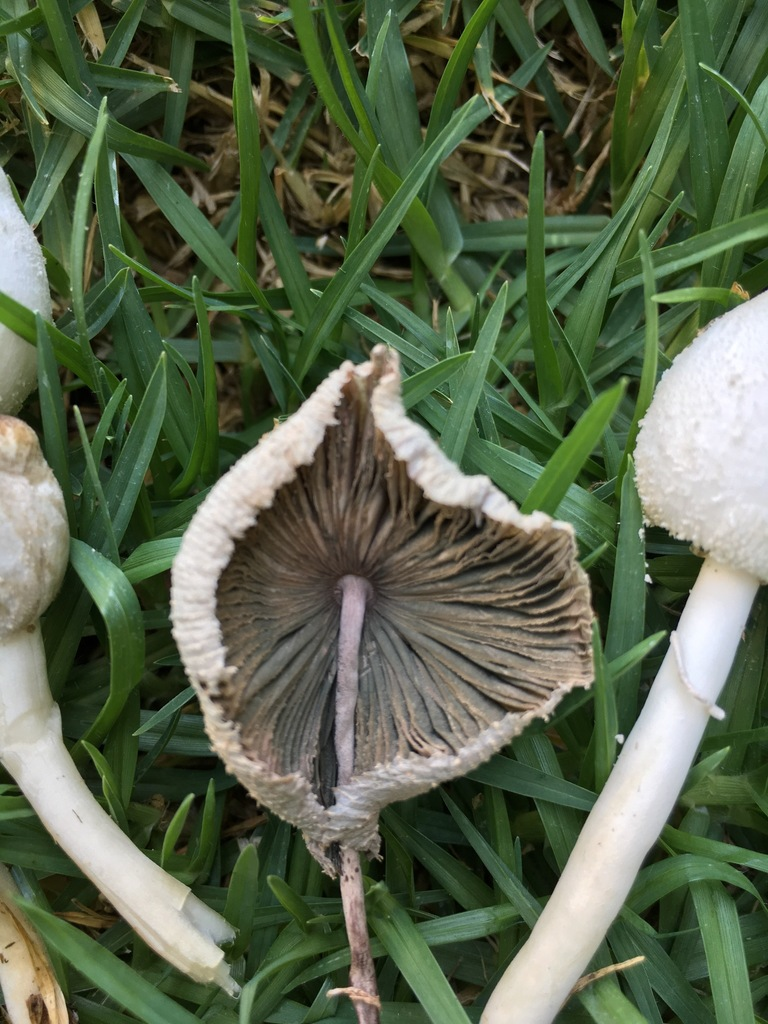
Leucocoprinus cepistipes with green-grey gill discolouration

=== Similar species ===
- Leucocoprinus cretaceus has often been confused with this species owing to the conflation between them in early description. It is distinguished by the larger white scales on the cap and stem and differs in spore size.
- Chlorophyllum hortense may also be confused owing to the similar appearance of the cap however the centre disc has a more yellow colour and the annulus is thicker.

== Habitat and distribution ==
This species has commonly been described from greenhouses and hothouses and is especially noted for growing in bark beds. In 1867 the Belgian botanist Jean Kickx documented Agaricus cepaestipes growing in tanbark in the greenhouses of the Ghent Botanical garden during the summer.

== Edibility ==
The species is edible, but not very palatable and may be easily confused for toxic species.
