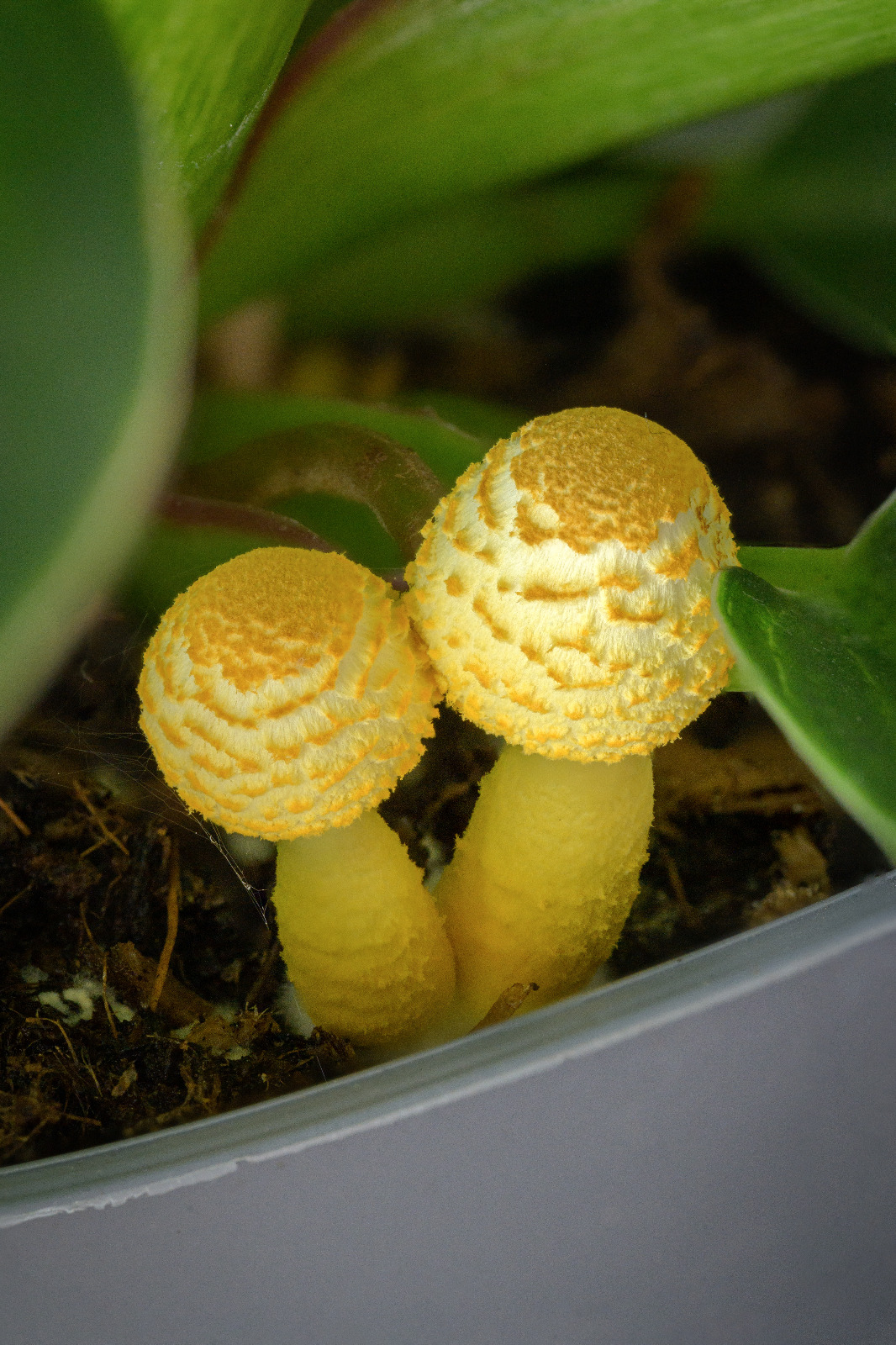

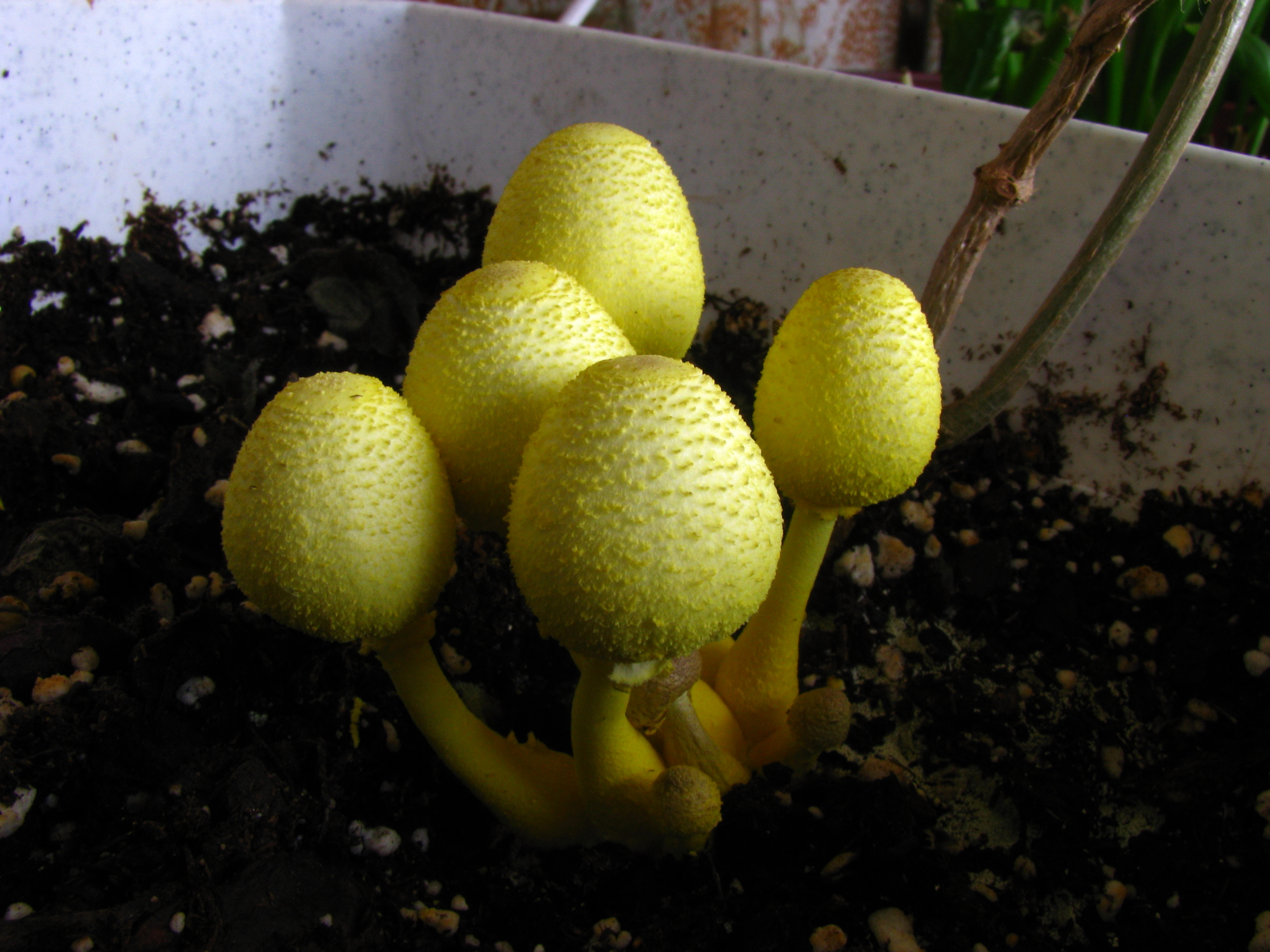

Scientific classification
- Kingdom: Fungi
- Division: Basidiomycota
- Class: Agaricomycetes
- Order: Agaricales
- Family: Agaricaceae
- Genus: Leucocoprinus
- Species: L. birnbaumii

Binomial name
- Leucocoprinus birnbaumii (Corda) Singer (1962)

Synonyms
- Species synonymy: Agaricus birnbaumii Corda (1839); Agaricus luteus Bolton (1789) [nom. illegit., non A. lutea Hudson (1778)]; Lepiota lutea (Bolton) Godfrin (1897); Leucocoprinus luteus (Bolton) Locq. (1945); Agaricus flammula Alb. & Schwein. (1805); Lepiota flammula (Alb. & Schwein.) Gillet (1874); Agaricus flos-sulphuris Schnizl. (1851); Lepiota flos-sulphuris (Schnizl.) Mattir. (1918); Leucocoprinus flos-sulphuris (Schnizl.) Cejp (1948); Lepiota aurea Massee (1912) [nom. illegit., non L. aurea (Matt.) Gray (1821)]; Lepiota pseudolicmophora Rea (1922); Lepiota coprinoides Beeli (1936)

= Leucocoprinus birnbaumii =

Species of fungus

Leucocoprinus birnbaumii, commonly known as the flower pot parasol, yellow parasol, flowerpot parasol, or plantpot dapperling, is a species of gilled mushroom in the family Agaricaceae. It is common in the tropics and subtropics. In temperate regions, it frequently occurs in greenhouses, flowerpots, and indoor terrariums. It is toxic if ingested.

Leucocoprinus birnbaumii
- Mycological characteristics
- Gills on hymenium
- Cap is ovate or umbonate
- Hymenium is free
- Stipe has a ring
- Spore print is white
- Ecology is saprotrophic
- Edibility is poisonous

== Taxonomy ==
The species was first described as Agaricus luteus in 1788 by the English mycologist James Bolton who described an observation from a hothouse near Halifax, three years earlier in 1785. Bolton also provided an illustration of the mushrooms. At the time gilled species were classified as Agaricus and luteus comes from the Latin for yellow or yellow-orange. Bolton suggested the common name of "Yellow Cottony Agaric" in reference to the soft, scaly texture of the mushroom.

However the name A. luteus had already been used to describe an unrelated Russula species and was published in 1778 by William Hudson so Bolton's A. luteus was illegitimate.

Nonetheless Agaricus luteus continued to be used and in James Sowerby's 1796 book entitled Coloured figures of English fungi or mushrooms his description of Agaricus cepaestipes (now Leucocoprinus cepistipes) also includes A. luteus and A. cretaceus (now Leucocoprinus cretaceus) which he considered to be "undoubtedly the same species", only differing in colour. So whilst his illustration of L. birnbaumii is intricately drawn, coloured and immediately recognisable today it rather confusingly has the yellow and white species side by side.

Sowerby writes that his observations of this species were made in bark beds around London where he described its presence as "not uncommon". He does not explicitly state that the observations were made in greenhouses however he does note that the yellow mushrooms were observed at Sir Abraham Hume's Wormleybury manor. During this period exotic plants from the East Indies and India were being cultivated in greenhouses and stove-heated hothouses at Wormleybury making it likely that this is where the mushrooms were found. This may give an indication as to where the fungi observed originated from.

In 1897 the French mycologist Julien Godfrin described the species as sulphur yellow in colour and classified it as Lepiota lutea. Many popular North American books continued to use this name until the 1980s and it still occasionally arises today.

In 1839 the Czech mycologist August Corda described the same species from Prague where it was found growing in a greenhouse in between pineapple plants by a garden inspector named Birnbaum and so he called it Agaricus birnbaumii. Corda said the greenhouse was in Count Salm's garden in Prague and Karel Cejp says the Salmovský gardens which was created by count Hugo František Salm behind house 506 in the New Town (Novém Městě) on what is today Salmovská street. The garden gradually declined after 1868 when the land was used for new development, but pineapples are still grown in the greenhouses in the gardens of what is today the Prague castle complex which also encompasses the Salm Palace (Czech: Salmovský palác). As this species is adept at spreading via potting soil and with transplanted plants it is possible that descendants of the mushrooms found by Birnbaum continue to grow amongst them.

The French mycologist Marcel Locquin classified it as Leucocoprinus luteus in 1945 and the German mycologist Rolf Singer reclassified it as Leucocoprinus birnbaumii in 1962.

=== English names ===
In the UK, Leucocoprinus birnbaumii has been given the recommended common name of "plantpot dapperling". In North America, it has also been called the "yellow parasol", "flowerpot parasol", "yellow houseplant mushroom", "lemon-yellow lepiota", or "yellow pleated parasol".

== Description ==
Leucocoprinus birnbaumii is a small, yellow dapperling mushroom. The fruit bodies are agaricoid (mushroom-shaped) and occur singly or in small clumps.

Cap: 2.5–6 cm wide in maturity, starting bulbous to cylindrical before expanding to hemispherical or conical and flattening or sometimes appearing umbonate with age. The surface is lemon yellow to sulphur yellow, smooth or slightly powdery and covered in ragged, fibrous scales which are easily removed. The scales are darker yellow or brownish with age and more densely concentrated towards the centre disc where they often form a patch whilst at the edges they are sparser. The cap edges are striated and grooved (sulcate-striate) with a paler colour present in the grooves whilst the edges curl inwards when young before curving out with age or straightening. The cap flesh is firm when young but becomes softer and more fragile with age, it is a dull whitish colour.

Gills: Free and often quite remote from the stem, sulphur yellow, with spacing that can vary from crowded to subdistant at up to 4mm wide. With age the gills may bulge in the middle (ventricose) and the edges can be fringed.

Stem: 3–10 cm long and 1.5–5 mm thick at the top tapering to a bulbous or club shaped base which is 4–15mm thick. The interior is hollow but pithy with a shiny white colour whilst the exterior surface is lemon yellow to sulphur yellow and may discolour brownish with age. It is covered in fine powdery or woolly scales (pruinose to floccose-squamulose) across the full length starting from just above the base. The thin, membranous stem ring is located anywhere between the top and bottom of the stem (superior to inferior) and is movable. The top surface of it is yellow whilst the underside is whitish however the ring is evanescent and may disappear. Spore print: White.

Spores: Ellipsoid to amygdaliform with a large germ pore. Dextrinoid. The average size range is 7.7–10.5 x 5.9–7.3 μm.

Smell: Indistinct or sometimes mushroomy.

Taste: Indistinct. When dry the mushroom may discolour tan or brownish and a similar brown colour is seen in caps of aborted mushroom pins which fail to grow.

=== Sclerotia ===
One feature of L. birnbaumii which is frequently visible are the sclerotia amongst the mycelium on the surface of the soil, which is an unusual trait amongst members of the Agaricales. The Italian mycologist Oreste Mattirolo described sclerotia in Lepiota flos-sulphuris in 1917 as well as in a species which he described as Lepiota incerta. In 1948 by the Czech mycologist Karel Cejp reclassified these species as Leucocoprinus flos-sulphuris and Leucocoprinus flos-sulphuris var. incerta, with both now regarded as synonyms of L. birnbaumii. Cejp also cites an earlier description of the sclerotia by the German mycologist Paul Christoph Hennings in 1898 who noted sclerotia in the hothouses of Heinrich Hildmann's cacti gardens in Birkenwerder. However due to the confusion in the early taxonomy of Leucocoprinus species Hennings describes them as belonging to L. cepaestipes, despite describing the mushrooms as golden yellow. Hennings describes the sclerotia as small (barely 1mm), light yellow and felt-like, with them covering entire areas of plant pots and beds. Hennings concludes that the species was likely introduced from South America citing specimens of sclerotia in the Berlin herbarium that were collected from Guadeloupe. Hennings compares them to Sclerotium mycetospora, which was described in 1822 by Elias Magnus Fries as being like mustard seeds which were white, furry and spread gregariously amongst the bark in a hothouse where they appeared to favour the light.

Typically sclerotia are most often discussed in the context of truffles or in the challenges faced by attempts at morel cultivation so are usually associated with large, hardened masses growing under the ground. The sclerotia in L. birnbaumii however are tiny (500-820 μm) hard, elliptical masses on top of the soil amongst the fibrous mycelium which have been described as whitish-beige or pale yellowish white. These have been shown to be genetically identical to the developed mushroom and have previously been cultured to produce mushrooms by introducing them to a substrate of sterilised wheat chaff before introducing the subsequently developed mycelium to a sand, peat, soil and sphagnum moss mix to ultimately fruit. Whilst L. birnbaumii itself is harmless to plants the sclerotia can have economic impacts on the production and sale of Orchids which often have transparent root pots where the sclerotia can collect. Their presence in these containers can reduce the aesthetic value of the plants and have impacts on the water retention of the substrate. Previous studies have noted an apparent propensity for L. birnbaumii to grow amongst orchids.

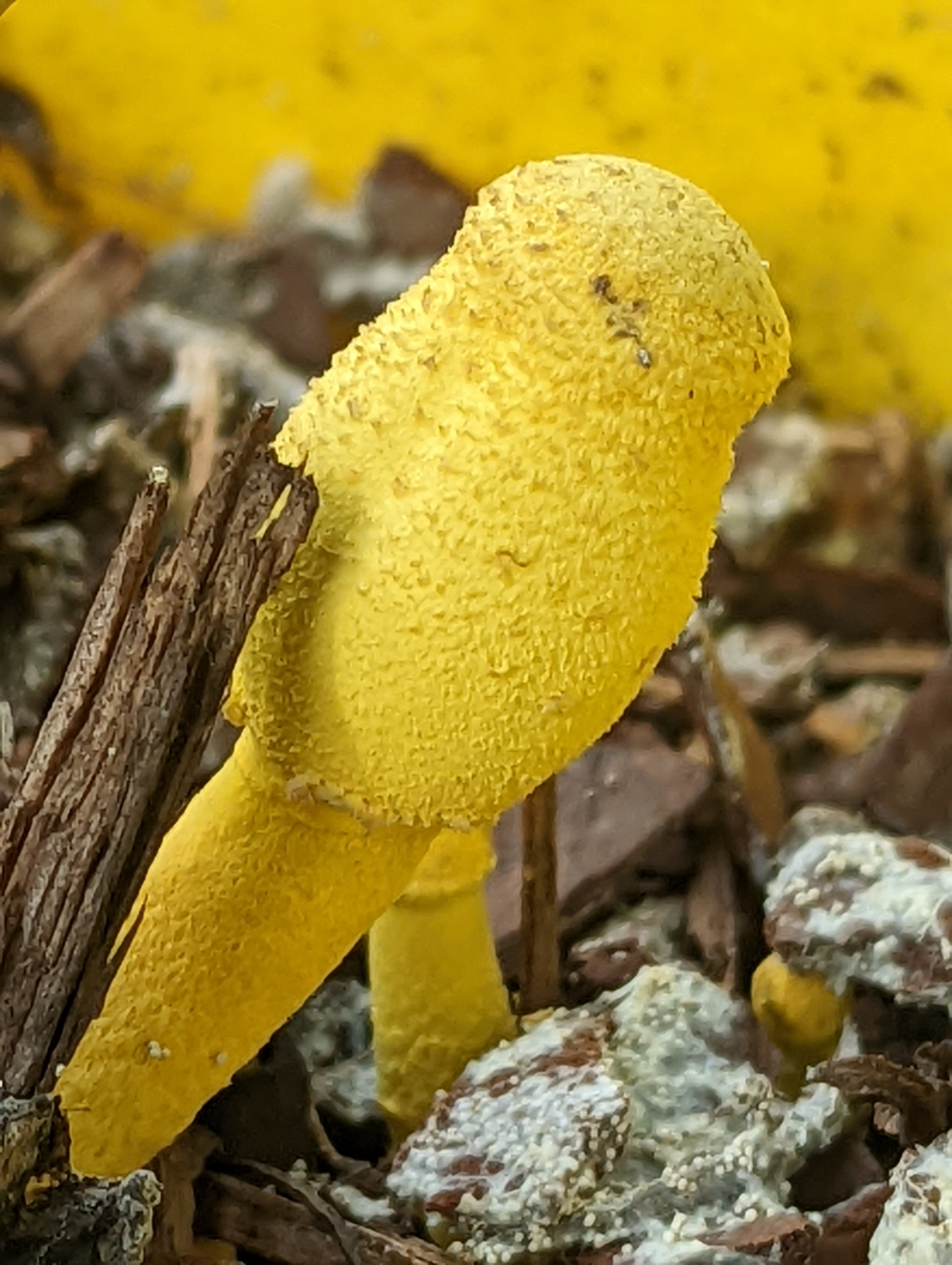
Leucocoprinus birnbaumii sclerotia

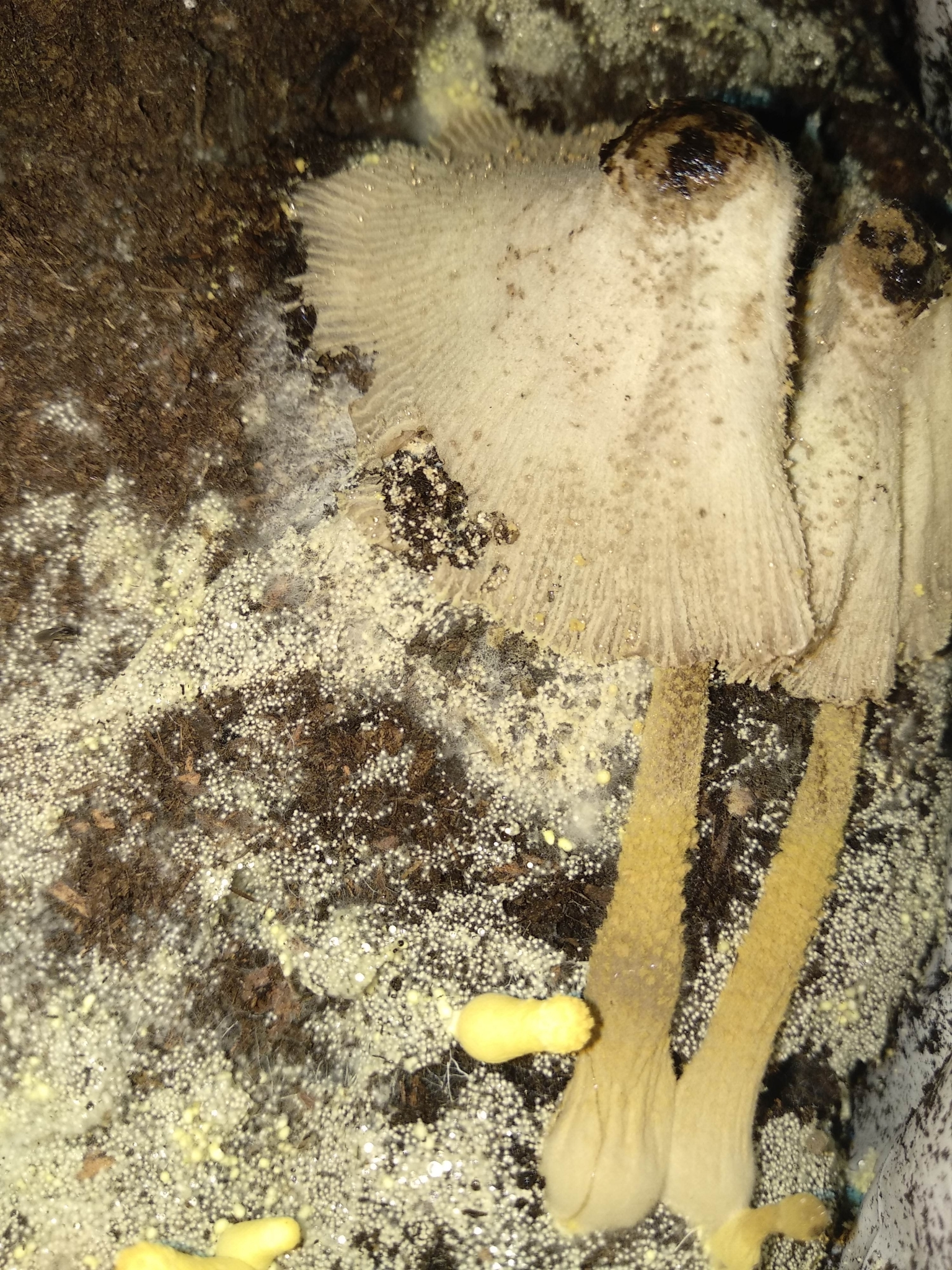
Sclerotia in a bag of potting soil

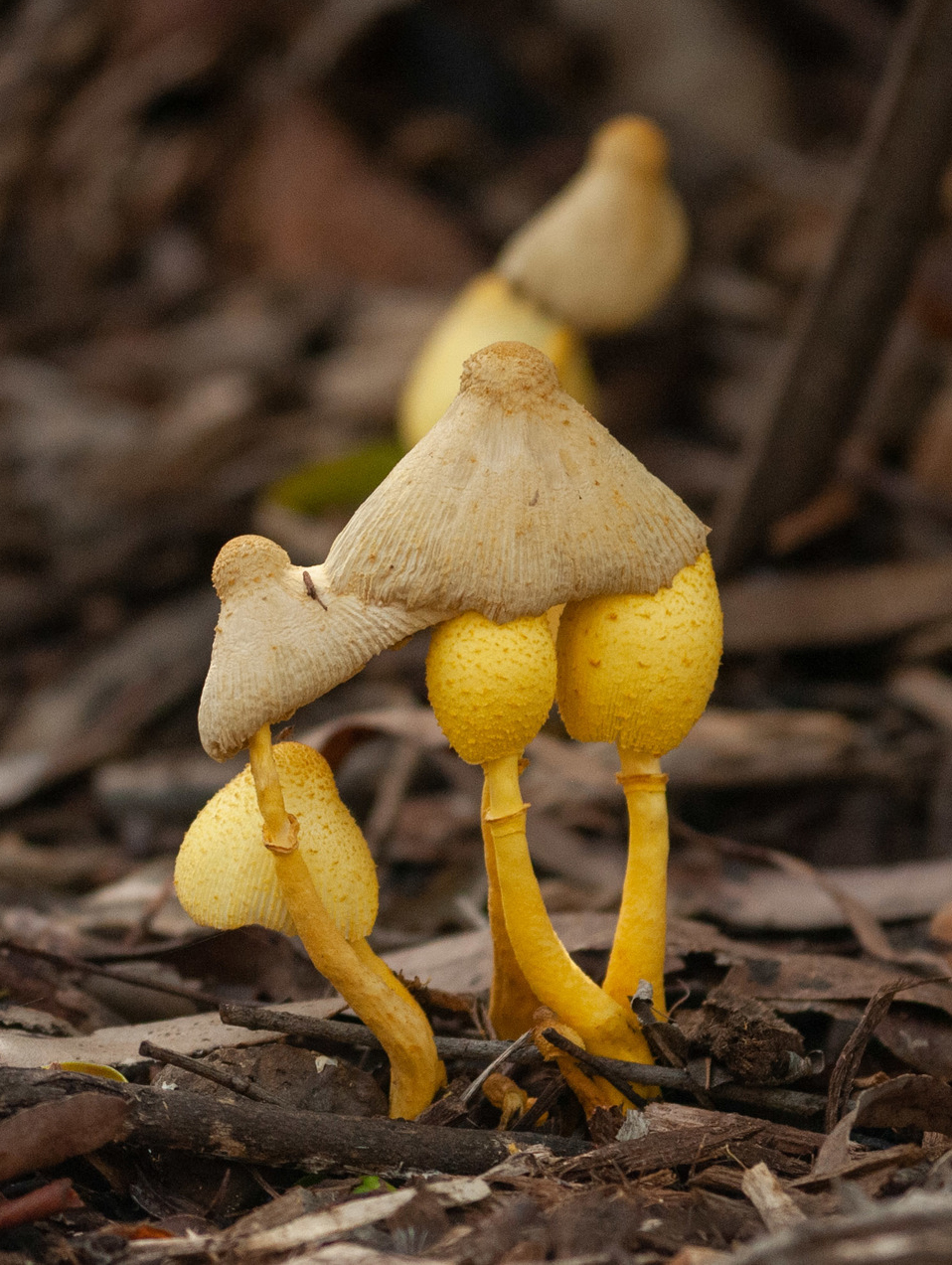
Old Leucocoprinus birnbaumii discolouring brown

=== Similar species ===
- Leucocoprinus straminellus is a similar, slightly paler (sometimes entirely whitish) species that may also occasionally appear in hothouses and plantpots in temperate regions. It is best distinguished microscopically by its smaller spores that lack a germ pore.
- Leucocoprinus flavescens is also small-spored and has a pale yellowish to white cap with a brownish centre.
- Leucocoprinus brunneoluteus is a similar yellow dapperling mushroom from South America with a pronounced brown umbo and thin, fragile flesh.
- Leucoagaricus sulphurellus (formerly Leucocoprinus sulphurellus) is a yellow species that occurs in the Caribbean area, but has gills that bruise bright blue-green.

== Habitat and distribution ==
Like all Leucocoprinus species, L. birnbaumii is a saprotroph, living on very decayed plant matter (humus or compost). The fungus is common throughout the tropics and subtropics, extending into warmer parts of the temperate zones. Rarely, it appears in cooler areas, fruit bodies having been recorded as far north as England, but these seem to be temporary introductions. In these areas (such as North America, Europe, and Australia) it is more usually found in hothouses and plant pots than in the wild.

iNaturalist suggests that the mushrooms are most commonly observed in the summer with a peak in July or August, whilst the observations on this site are not always reliable due to misidentification, this seasonality is to be expected from a tropical species that has been introduced into temperate climates.

In a 1907 study the American mycologist Andrew Price Morgan documented Lepiota lutea growing in greenhouses in Columbus, Ohio.

In 2019 a study documented L. birnbaumii growing from the stump of a dead lemon tree in an orchard near Damietta, Egypt during the autumn.

== Toxicity ==
Leucocoprinus birnbaumii is a toxic mushroom. If eaten it can cause gastroenteritis-like symptoms. North Carolina State University classifies the species as having medium severity poison characteristics whilst the University of Massachusetts Amherst say that the level of toxicity is simply unknown at present.

== Chemistry ==
The yellow color of the mushrooms is from a pair of indole alkaloids known as birnbaumins. Birnbaumin B is the major alkaloid component and has the formula C_{16}H_{20}N_{6}O_{5} whilst birnbaumin A has one less oxygen atom. Extraction methods used to isolate these compounds also yield L-tryptophan.

A 2015 study succeeded in isolating a number of fatty acids from Leucocoprinus birnbaumii which showed moderate but selective anti-microbial effects. Three fatty acid compounds were isolated and tested against six microorganisms. Of them, linoleic acid displayed some inhibition against Streptococcus pyogenes and less against Staphylococcus aureus, oleic acid had some inhibition of Pseudomonas aeruginosa whilst methyl linoleate had limited inhibition against all three bacteria species. They did not show any results against the other two bacteria they were tested against (E. coli and MRSA) or against the pathogenic yeast strain Candida albicans.

== Relationship with potted plants ==
Leucocoprinus birnbaumii is a common find in greenhouses and potted plants all over the world having been spread by human activity. When Europeans started exploring the tropics and bringing back exotic plant species for study or cultivation they were unwittingly bringing fungal hitchhikers back with them in the soil. The original classification of this species from a greenhouse in England in the late 1700s and the observation from the early 1800s in Prague which gave it the name birnbaumii demonstrate how long this species has been present in Europe. Despite this tropical species likely being unable to survive in these countries in the wild due to the cold temperatures it continues to spread via human activity. The heat and humidity of greenhouses or indoor plant pots evidently creates a habitat in which this species can thrive with garden centres and nurseries serving as hubs to distribute L. birnbaumii all over Europe. Botanical gardens may serve as another means of spreading as visitors unknowingly collect spores on their clothes and bring them into their homes.

However, when L. birnbaumii mushrooms suddenly appear in a plant pot which had shown no previous signs of them it doesn't mean the fungus has only just been introduced. Due to the length of time the mycelium requires to grow, it is more likely that the fungus was always present in the soil from the moment the plant (or compost used) was acquired and that the conditions for it to fruit have only recently been met. Mushroom production will occur when the moisture content of the soil and humidity of the air is adequate. Even when no mushrooms are visible the fungus may still be alive and thriving in the soil waiting for the next opportunity to fruit.

As a saprotrophic species L. birnbaumii is harmless to plants. The presence of this fungus in the soil may serve to improve the quality of it as it can help to break down organic matter and provide nutrients that the plants require. However, if the mushrooms are appearing regularly it can be a sign that the soil is too moist and that the plant may be being over-watered. Whilst L. birnbaumii itself is harmless to plants, the high moisture conditions in which it fruits can invite a host of other fungi and mold species which may harm the plant and result in root rot. In this regard L. birnbaumii can serve as a useful indicator to help ensure plants remain healthy.

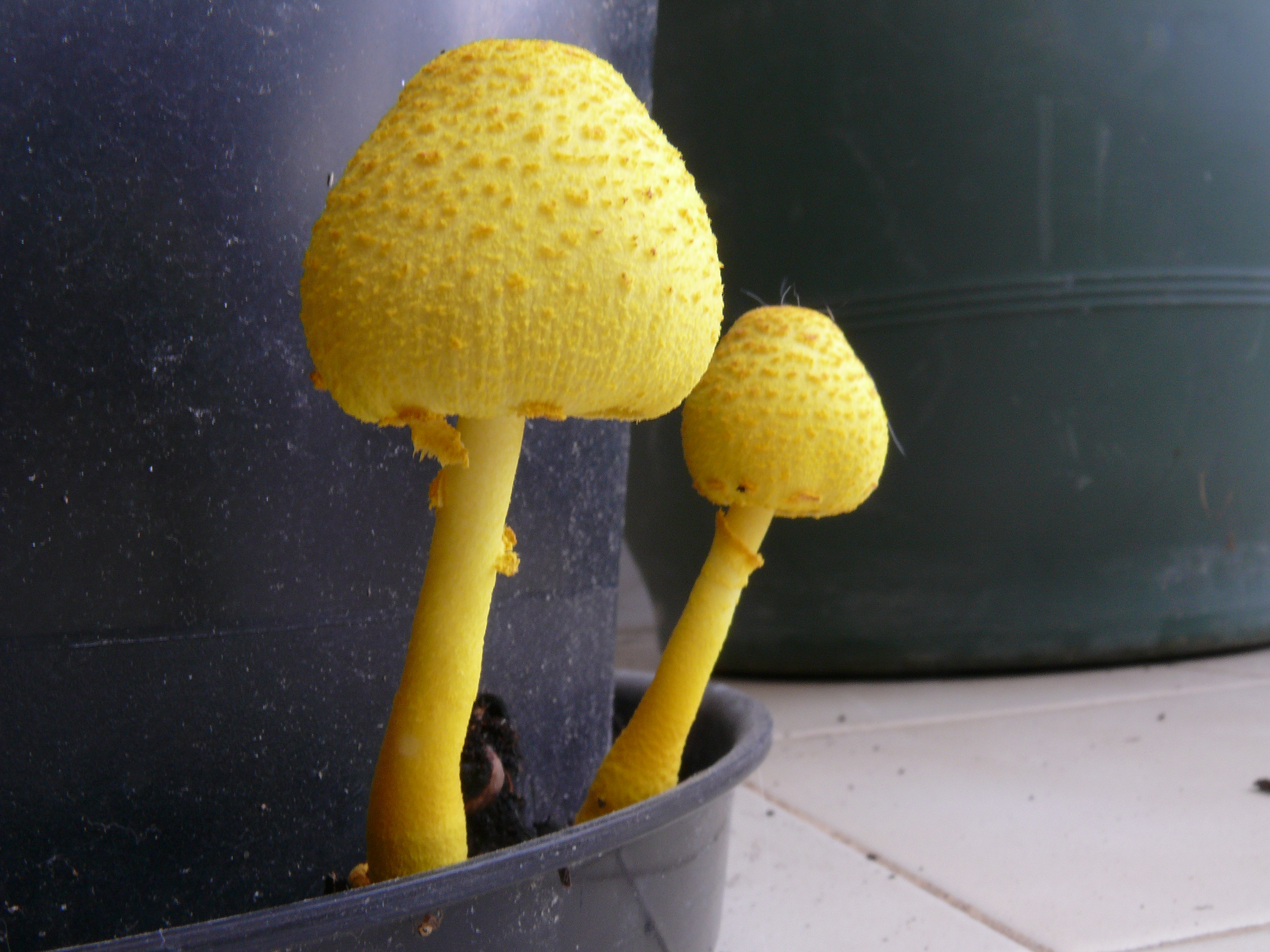
Growing from base of pot

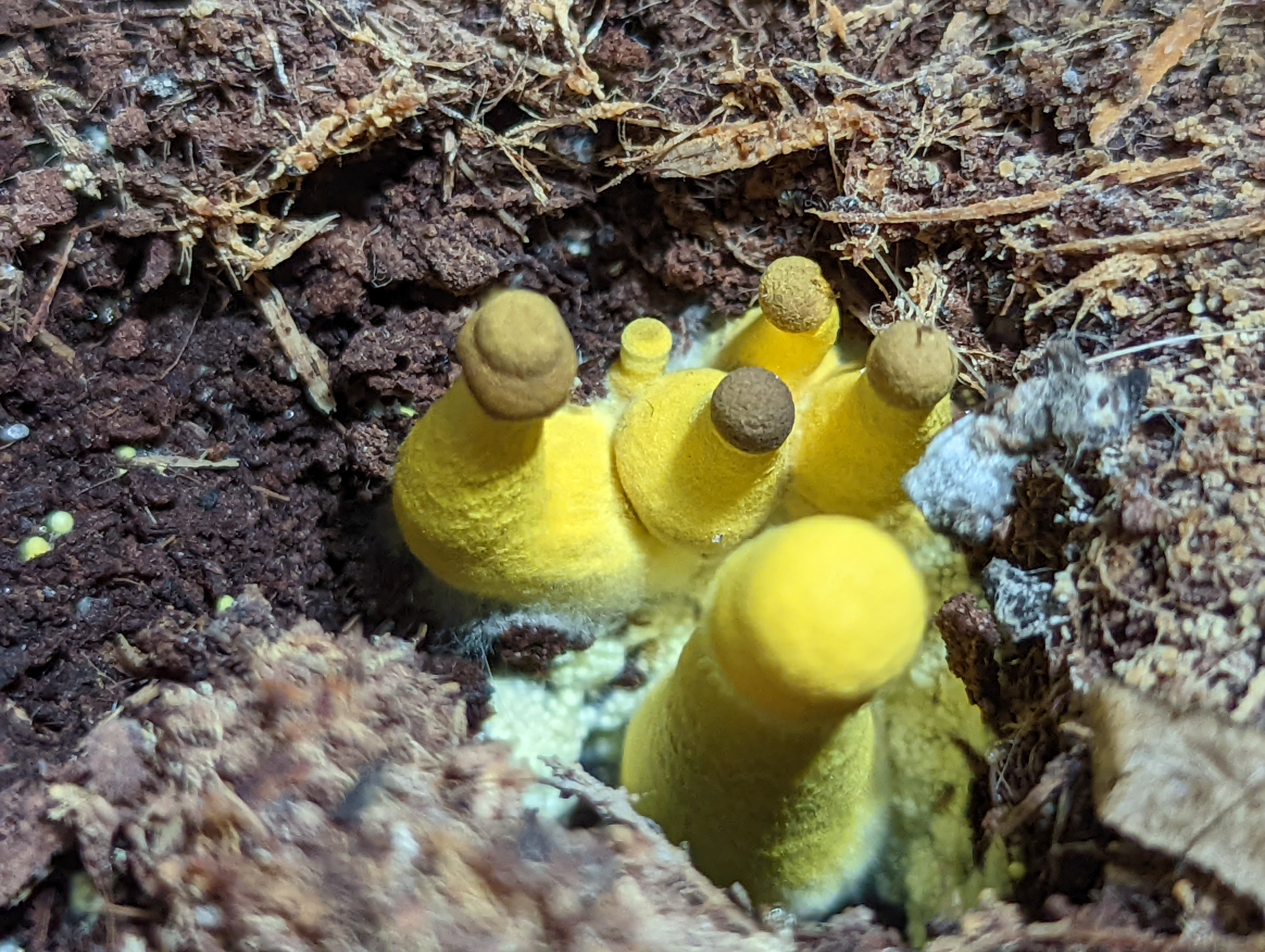
Pins aborting and turning brown

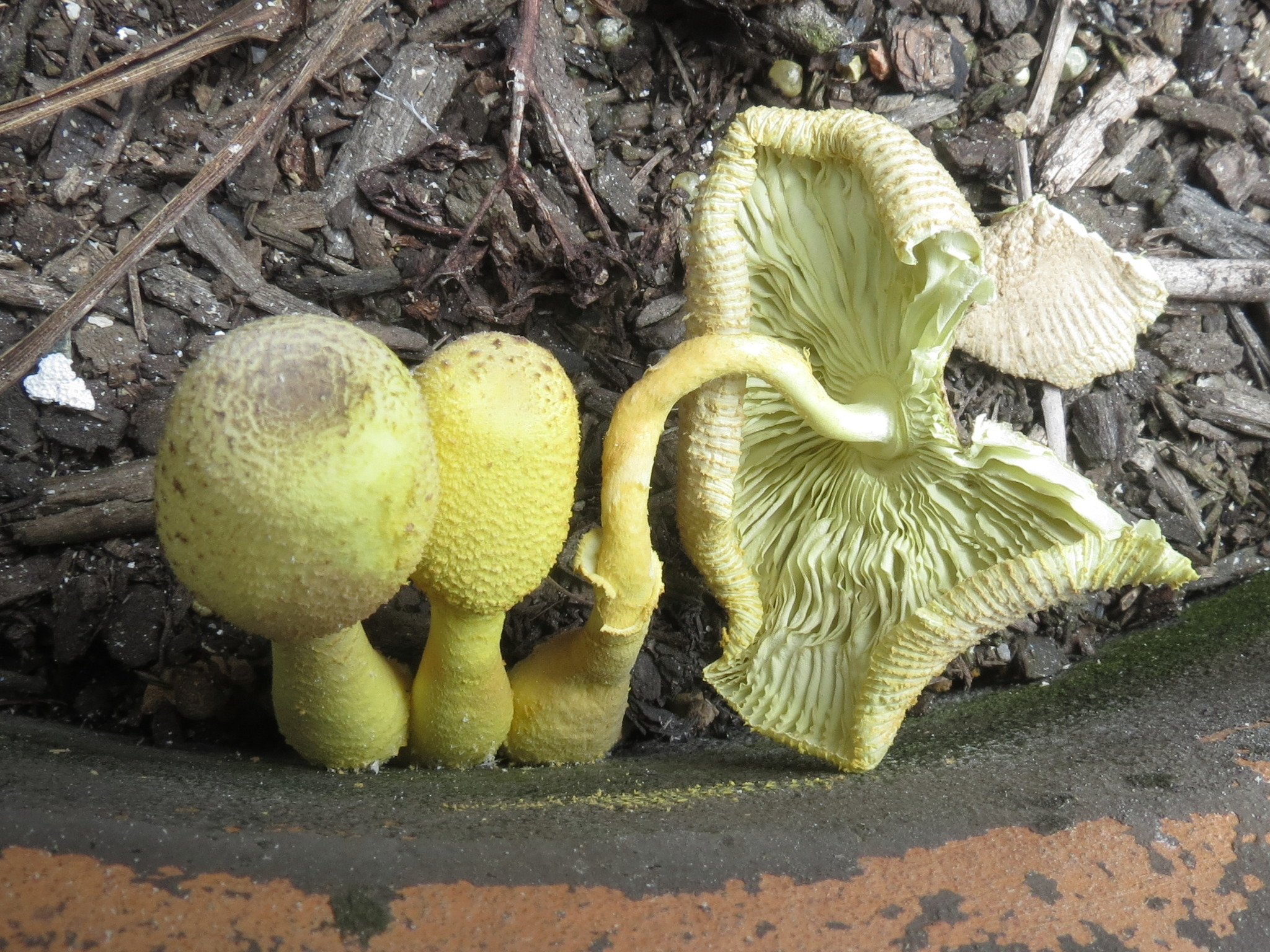
Mature cap drying up
