= Leucocoprinus flavescens =

Scientific classification
- Kingdom: Fungi
- Division: Basidiomycota
- Class: Agaricomycetes
- Order: Agaricales
- Family: Agaricaceae
- Genus: Leucocoprinus
- Species: L. flavescens

Binomial name
- Leucocoprinus flavescens (Morgan) H.V. Sm. (1981)

Synonyms
- Lepiota flavescens Morgan (1907)

Species of fungus

Leucocoprinus flavescens
- Mycological characteristics
- Gills on hymenium
- Cap is campanulate or umbonate
- Hymenium is free
- Stipe has a ring
- Spore print is white
- Ecology is saprotrophic
- Edibility is unknown

Leucocoprinus flavescens is a species of mushroom-producing fungus in the family Agaricaceae.

== Taxonomy ==
It was first described in 1907 by the American mycologist Andrew Price Morgan who classified it as Lepiota flavescens and reclassified as Leucocoprinus flavescens by the American botanist and mycologist Helen Vandervort Smith in 1981.

== Description ==
Leucocoprinus flavescens is a small mushroom with very thin white to pale yellow flesh.

Cap: 1–2.5cm or up to 4cm at the extreme. Ovoid to campanulate (bell shaped) with an umbo before flattening or becoming convex with age. The surface is pale greenish-yellow and is covered in fine powdery scales with smooth striations whilst the central disk is brownish but smooth. Stem: 2–6 cm and 1–2 mm in thickness with a slightly swollen base of 3–5 mm thick where white mycelium may be present. The stem surface is pale sulphur-yellow and is likewise covered with fine powdery scales like the cap though these may disappear with age leaving the stem smooth and it sometimes discolours reddish-brown. The fragile stem ring is pale yellow and located towards the top of the stem (superior) but it may disappear. Gills: Free, close and yellowish. Spore print: White. Spores: Ellipsoid, smooth. 4.8–6.6 (7.2) × (3.5) 4.9–5.5 μm. Taste: Bitter. Smell: Indistinct.

== Habitat and distribution ==
In a 1907 study Morgan documented Lepiota flavescens growing on the ground under Robinia and Gleditsia trees in Southern Ohio whereas Smith documented the species from greenhouses in Southern California and Massachusetts. It has also been documented in Illinois and in 2010 it was recorded in Washington state where it was found growing in large clusters in a covered outdoors container filled with potting soil intended for a greenhouse.

L. flavescens is not very well known and not often recorded. It is likely that it is often misclassified as other Leucocoprinus species which are simply more well known or more commonly suggested by identification algorithms used by the public such as iNaturalist. The limited number of observations which have been made suggest the species is uncommon but that it has a widespread distribution in the United States with observations also made in Costa Rica.

== Similar species ==
- Leucocoprinus birnbaumii may be the most common species which L. flavescens is confused with simply because it is so well known. However L. flavescens is noticeably paler, less yellow and has more fragile flesh.
- Leucocoprinus fragilissimus may also be confused with it however L. flavescens is less fragile than this species.
- Leucocoprinus straminellus is described similarly with some sources suggesting they may be synonymous although they appear to have different sized spores and different coloured cap centres.
