= Birnbaumins =

- Birnbaumin A

- Birnbaumin B

Identifiers
CAS Number	A: 858648-32-5; B: 858648-33-6
3D model (JSmol)	A: Interactive image; B: Interactive image
PubChem CID	A: 136734815; B: 136734816
CompTox Dashboard (EPA)	A: DTXSID301046010; B: DTXSID001046011
- InChI: A: InChI=1S/C16H20N6O4/c17-14(15(18)21-25)19-7-3-4-8-20-16(24)13(23)11-9-22(26)12-6-2-1-5-10(11)12/h1-2,5-6,9,19,26H,3-4,7-8,17-18H2,(H,20,24) Key: BTVKTPDEMYHRTI-UHFFFAOYSA-N; B: InChI=1S/C16H20N6O5/c17-14(15(18)21-26)19-6-1-2-7-20-16(25)13(24)10-8-22(27)12-9(10)4-3-5-11(12)23/h3-5,8,19,23,27H,1-2,6-7,17-18H2,(H,20,25) Key: FLACAKNDCLFMEK-UHFFFAOYSA-N
- SMILES: A: C1=CC=C2C(=C1)C(=CN2O)C(=O)C(=O)NCCCCNC(=C(N)N=O)N; B: C1=CC2=C(C(=C1)O)N(C=C2C(=O)C(=O)NCCCCNC(=C(N)N=O)N)O

Properties
Chemical formula	C_{16}H_{20}N_{6}O_{4} (A); C_{16}H_{20}N_{6}O_{5} (B)

Hazards
- Occupational safety and health (OHS/OSH)
Main hazards	Toxic if ingested
- Except where otherwise noted, data are given for materials in their standard state (at 25 °C [77 °F], 100 kPa). Infobox references

Birnbaumins are a pair of yellow indole alkaloids first isolated from the flowerpot parasol mushroom. These alkaloids can cause gastric ulcers if consumed.
