= Johannes Rick =

Austrian-born mycologist in Brazil (1869–1946)

Johannes (João Evangelista) Rick (19 January 1869 – 1946) was an Austrian-born Brazilian priest and mycologist considered the "father of Brazilian mycology". He was the first to systematically document the fungal biodiversity, particularly the macrofungi, of Southern Brazil. Rick established communications with several contemporary mycologists, such as Giacomo Bresadola, Curtis Gates Lloyd, Heinrich Rehm, and Hans Sydow, who helped him identify his Brazilian collections. Rick was a schoolteacher in Feldkirch from 1894 to 1898 before becoming a theology student in Valkenburg (Netherlands) from 1899 until 1902. After moving to Brazil in 1902, he was a teacher until 1915, then a social worker from 1915 to 1929, and finally Professor of theology until 1942. Between 1904 and 1911 he edited the exsiccata Fungi Austro-Americani exsiccati, the later three fascicles together with Ferdinand Theissen.

== Selected works ==
Rick, J. (1960). "Basidiomycetes Eubasidii in Rio Grande do Sul - Brasilia 4. Meruliaceae, Polyporaceae e Boletaceae". Iheringia Série Botânica 7: 193–295.

== See also ==
- Category:Taxa named by Johannes Rick
