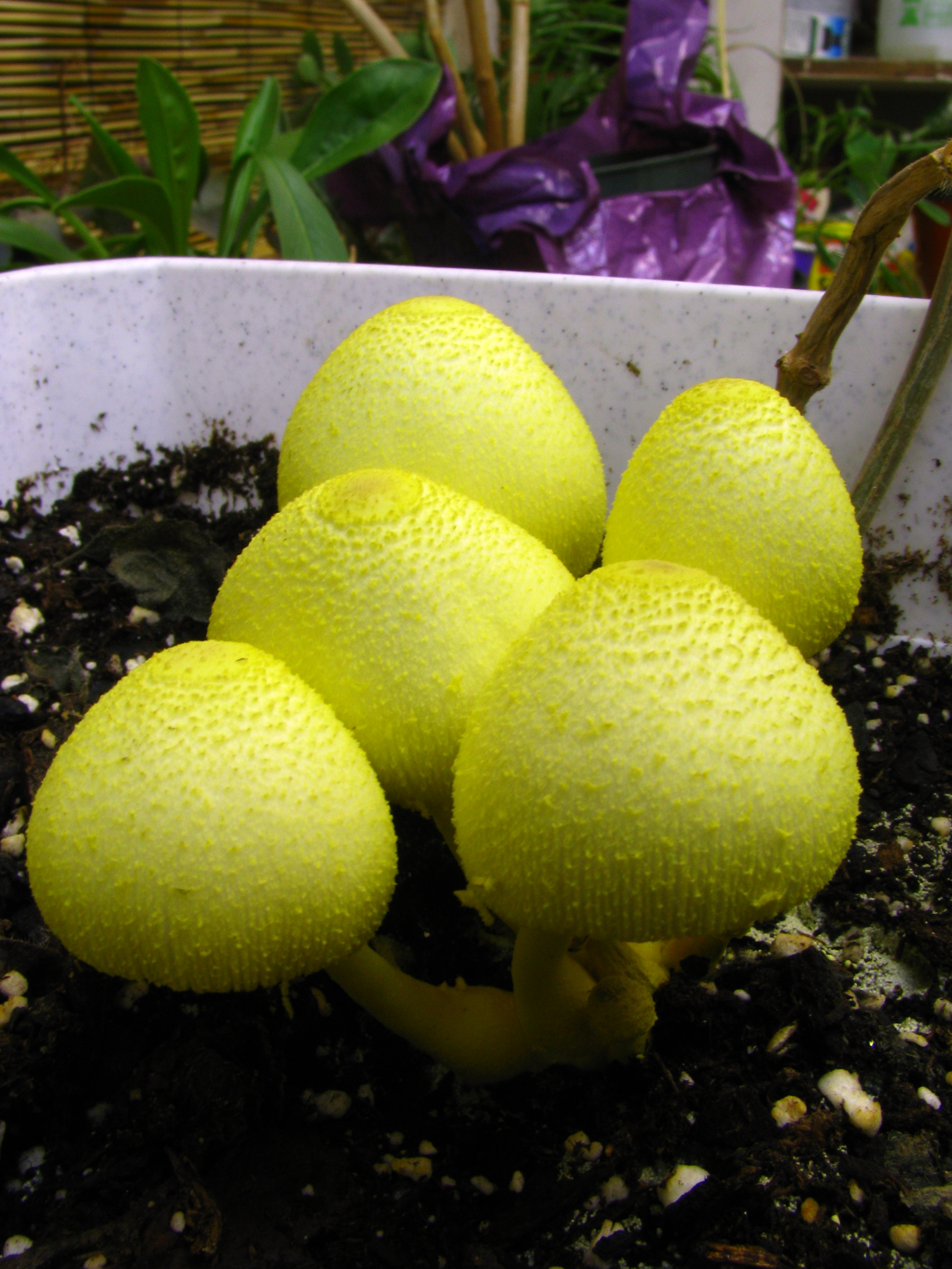
- Leucocoprinus birnbaumii

Scientific classification
- Kingdom: Fungi
- Division: Basidiomycota
- Class: Agaricomycetes
- Order: Agaricales
- Family: Agaricaceae
- Genus: Leucocoprinus; Pat. (1888)

Type species
- Leucocoprinus cepistipes (Sowerby) Pat. (1889)

Synonyms
- Mastocephalus Battarra ex Earle (1909); Lepiota subgen. Leucobolbitius J.E.Lange (1935); Lepiotophyllum Locq. (1942); Leucobolbitius (J.E.Lange) Locq. (1952)

= Leucocoprinus =

Genus of fungi

Leucocoprinus
- Mycological characteristics
- Gills on hymenium
- Cap is ovate or umbonate
- Hymenium is free
- Stipe has a ring
- Spore print is white
- Ecology is saprotrophic
- Edibility is unknown or poisonous

Leucocoprinus is a genus of fungi in the family Agaricaceae. The best-known member is the distinctive yellow mushroom Leucocoprinus birnbaumii, which is found in plant pots and greenhouses worldwide. The type species is Leucocoprinus cepistipes. The genus has a widespread distribution and since many members of the Leucoagaricus genus were transferred to Leucocoprinus in 2024 it contains over 240 recognised species. Prior to this reclassification species described as Leucocoprinus often tended to be found in tropical regions whereas many species described as Leucoagaricus were found in temperate regions however there is now no such distinction with Leucocoprinus species frequently found in diverse habitats worldwide.

== Taxonomy ==
The genus was created in 1888 by the French mycologist Narcisse Théophile Patouillard.

Due to the superficially similar features which many Leucocoprinus, Leucoagaricus and Lepiota species have these genera and the species within them have been subject to a great deal of reclassification over the years. One example of this is Leucocoprinus leucothites which is a very common and widespread species that has numerous synonyms formerly belonging to all three genera and since 1977 had been accepted as Leucoagaricus leucothites. In 2023 this species was reclassified as Leucocoprinus leucothites which began the process of merging the Leucoagaricus and Leucocoprinus genera that had long been known to have no clear genetic distinction with which to divide them. In 2024 numerous species from the Leucoagaricus genus were then reclassified as Leucocoprinus in a series of papers by various researchers.

These genera along with Cystolepiota, Chlorophyllum and Macrolepiota are often referred to as Lepiotoid mushrooms. Typical macroscopic characteristics include white spore prints, the presence of a stem ring formed from the partial veil and gills which are free from the stem. There are always exceptions to these details however. Flaky or woolly scales on the cap or stem of these mushrooms and a distinctly coloured central disc are common features amongst many species but are likewise observed in many other genera. Reliable identification of Lepiotoid mushrooms at the species level can be notoriously difficult. Many species can only reliably be distinguished by microscopic details and chemical reagent tests.

== Species ==
Commonly known species include:

- Leucocoprinus barssii (Worldwide)
- Leucocoprinus birnbaumii (Worldwide)
- Leucocoprinus brebissonii (Worldwide)
- Leucocoprinus brunneoluteus (South America)
- Leucocoprinus cepistipes (Worldwide)
- Leucocoprinus cygneus (Europe)
- Leucocoprinus cretaceus (Worldwide)
- Leucocoprinus flavescens
- Leucocoprinus fragilissimus
- Leucocoprinus griseofloccosus (Europe)
- Leucocoprinus heinemannii
- Leucocoprinus ianthinus (Worldwide)
- Leucocoprinus leucothites (Worldwide)
- Leucocoprinus straminellus

Many of these species have been documented growing in plant pots and greenhouses and so may have a worldwide distribution in captivity with introduction into the wild being possible where temperatures are suitable for these tropical species. Several of the best known species were originally described from greenhouses before ever being recorded in the wild.

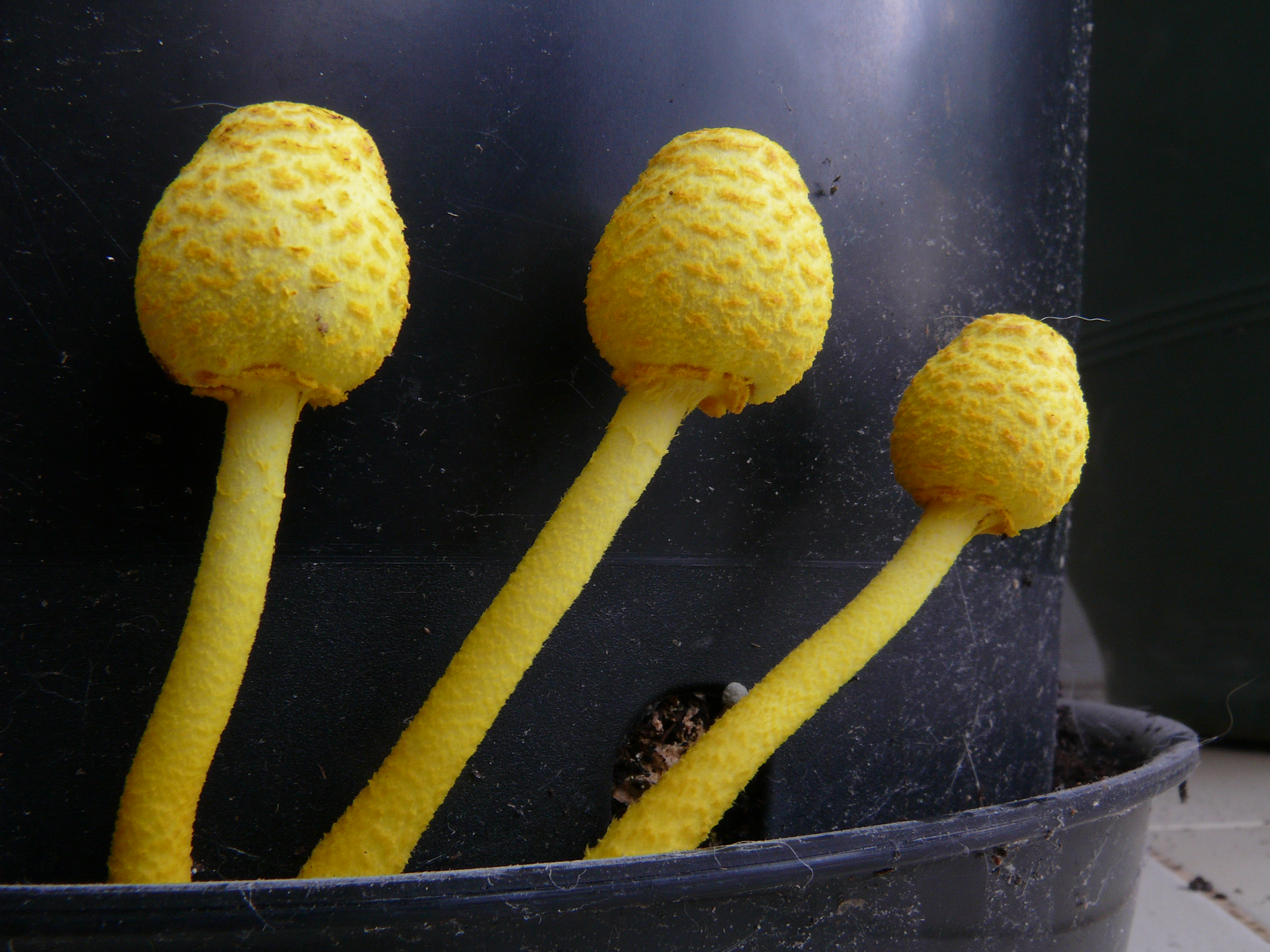
Leucocoprinus birnbaumii

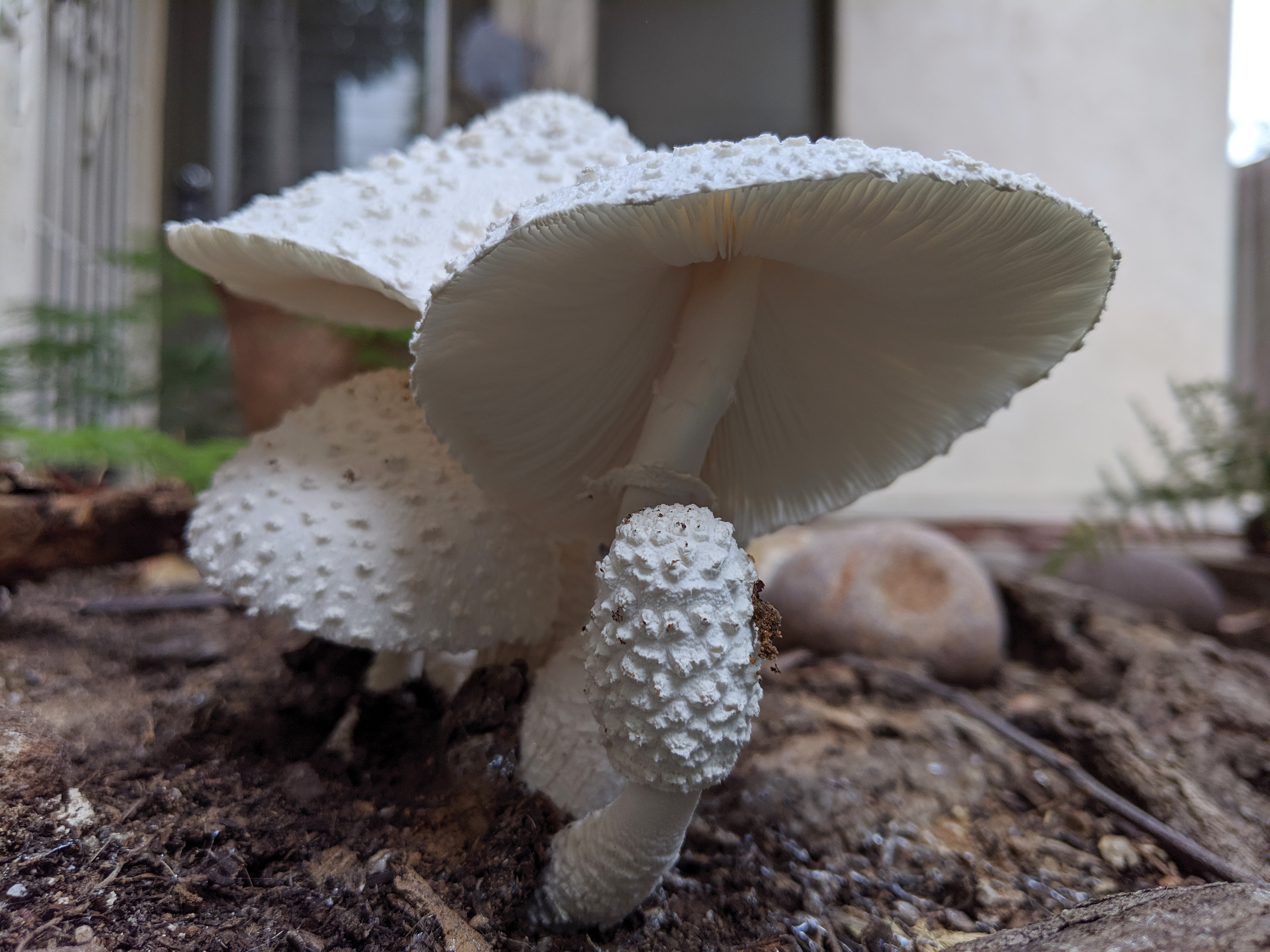
Leucocoprinus cretaceus

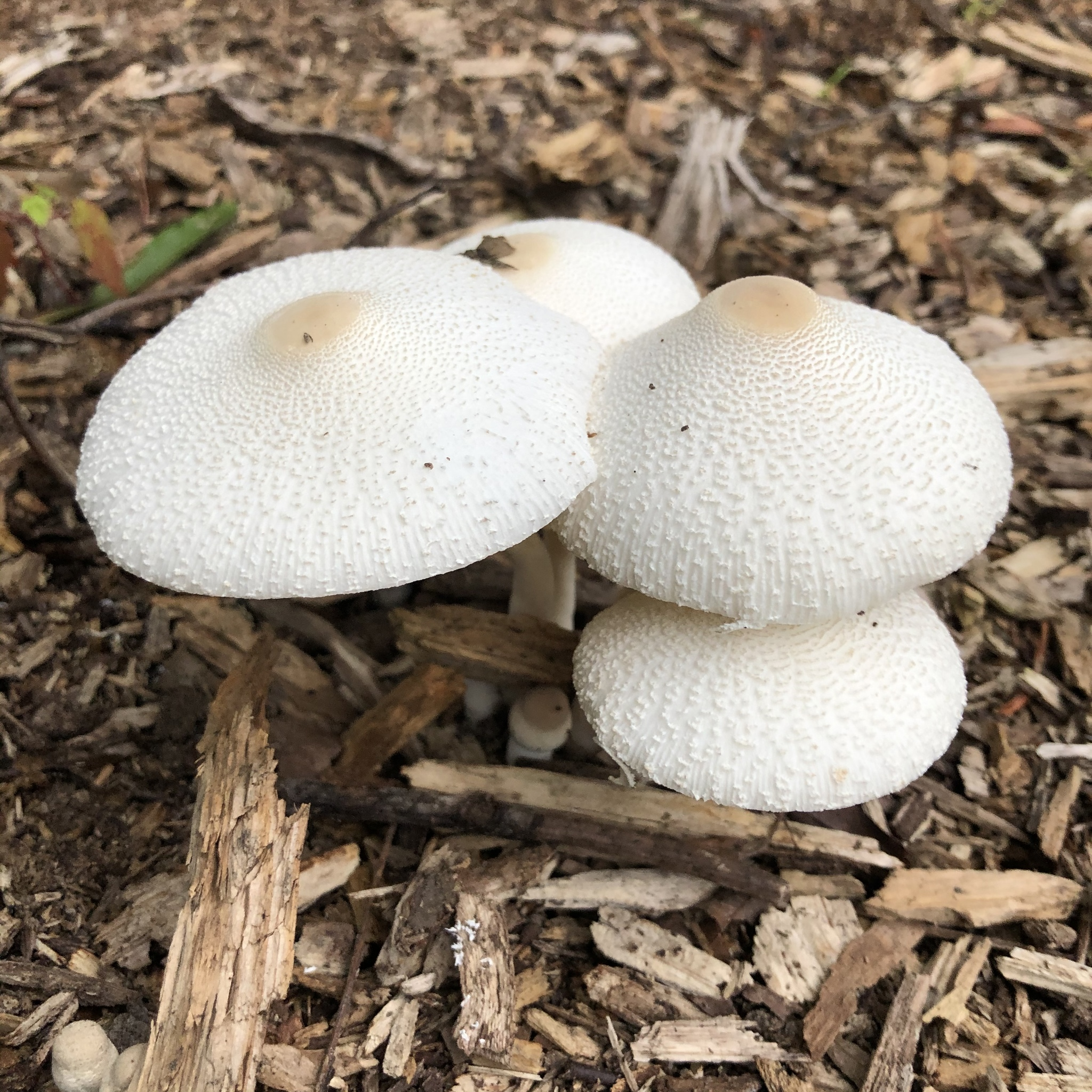
Leucocoprinus cepistipes

== Habitat and distribution ==
Many Leucocoprinus species originate from tropical climates where they thrive in the hot and humid conditions of rainforests however species have now spread all over the world due to human activity. Numerous species in this genus were introduced to Europe by early explorers bringing exotic plants back from tropical climates which carried unseen fungal hitchhikers in the soil. As a result, new and unknown species of mushrooms began appearing in greenhouses and hothouses all over Europe which piqued the interest of budding new mycologists who sought to classify these strange new 'plants', as mushrooms were then considered to be. Some Leucocoprinus species were observed in Europe in the 18th century before ever being found in the wild.

Leucocoprinus birnbaumii was first described in 1788 from an observation in a hothouse in Halifax, England. In 1793 British botanist James Sowerby observed it growing at Wormleybury manor, likely in the hothouses and greenhouses which contained plants from the East Indies and India. Its specific epithet is named for Mr Birnbaum, a gardener who found the yellow mushrooms growing in greenhouses amongst pineapples in the Salmovský gardens in Prague in the 1830s.

Leucocoprinus cretaceus was also first classified in 1788 by Pierre Bulliard from observations made in greenhouses and in planters under cold frames in France however as Bulliard's illustration more closely matched that of L. cepistipes it caused confusion in the identification of these two species. In 1871 the German botanist Otto Kuntze stated that the mushrooms grew in large numbers in gardens and greenhouses but did not appear too often.

Leucocoprinus cepistipes has a more complicated history as it was routinely conflated with L. cretaceus due to the similarly white appearance or even considered to simply be a white version of L. birnbaumii before species classifications were better established. James Sowerby's detailed illustrations from 1796, made from specimens found in bark beds around London, depict both a white and yellow species side by side which he considered to be 'undoubtedly the same species' saying that they 'differ in nothing but colour'.

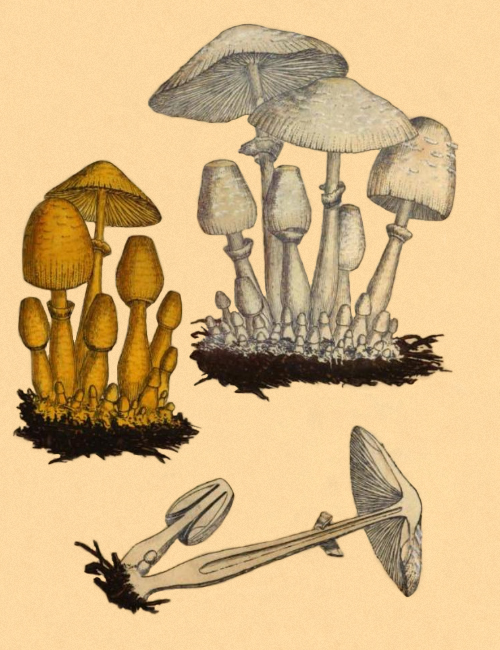
James Sowerby's illustrations of Leucocoprinus mushrooms, 1796

These species are still commonly found in greenhouses and plant pots in Europe and all over the world. Centuries of buying and selling tropical plants has created an effective distribution network for Leucocoprinus species as the conditions of greenhouses and indoor plant pots can mimic the warm and humid tropical conditions which these mushrooms require. Collecting exotic plants in botanical gardens may also help to spread these species.

Other Leucocoprinus species such as L. ianthinus are also commonly observed growing in plant pots with this species being described from a barkbed in a hothouse in Kew Gardens in 1888. Observations of this species are largely limited to plant pots and it is unclear where it is native to. In some regions it may be warm enough for introduced Leucocoprinus species to survive in the wild or grow outside but in regions with cold winter temperatures their distribution is generally limited to plant pots and greenhouses. There are however also common Leucocoprinus species which grow in temperate climates like L. brebissonii which can be found outside in Europe and is especially common on the West coast of the United States whereas L. fragilissimus is uncommon in Europe but common on the East coast of the United States.

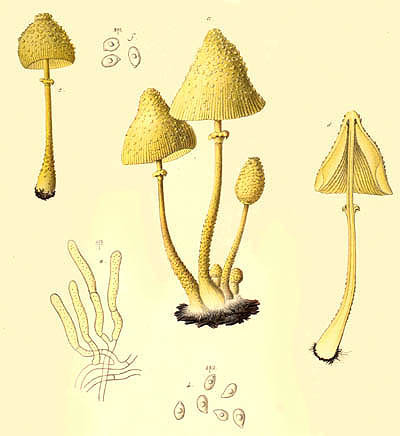
Emile Boudier's illustrations of Leucocoprinus birnbaumii, 1901

== See also ==
- List of Agaricaceae genera
- List of Agaricales genera
- List of Leucocoprinus species
