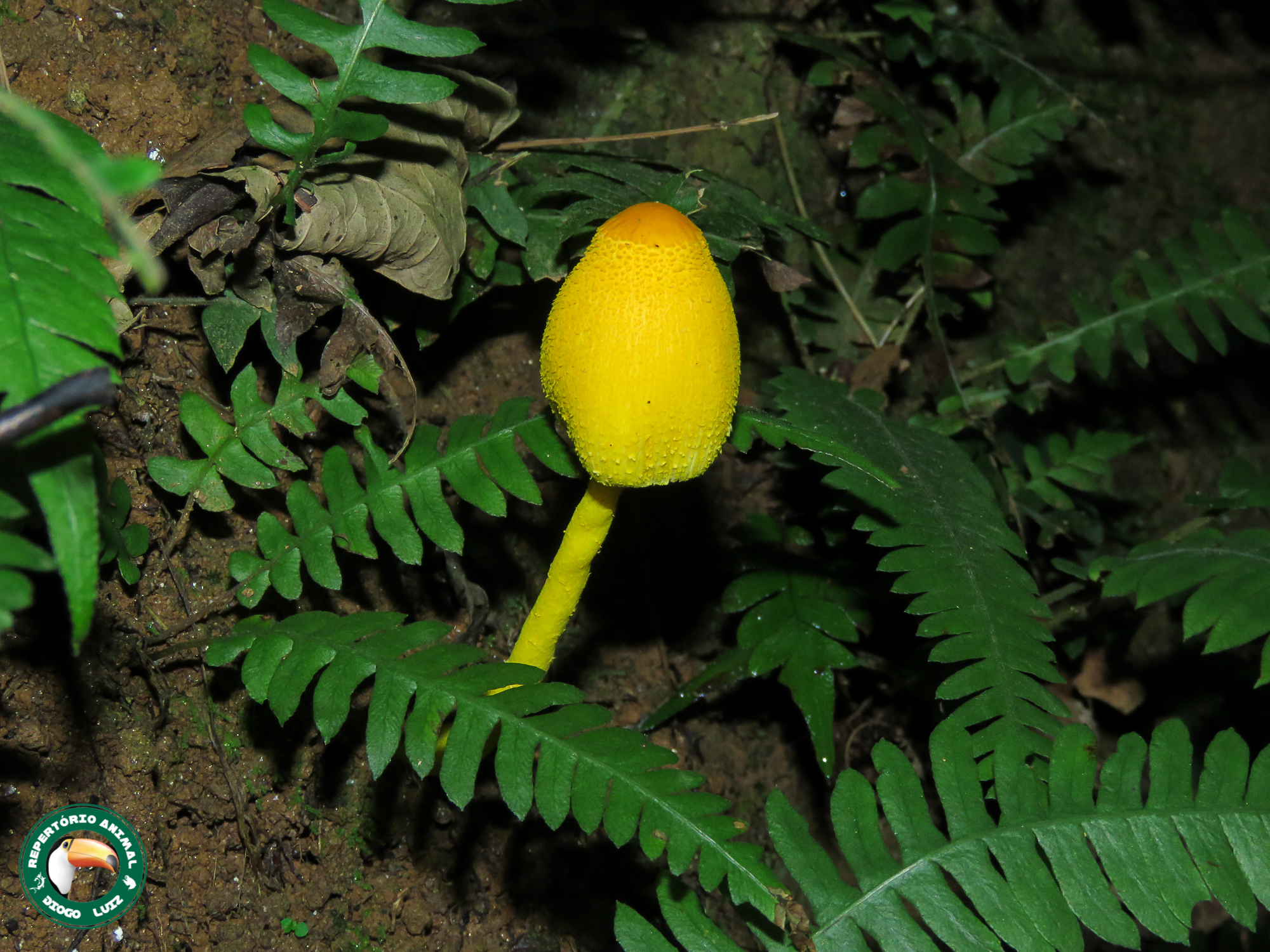

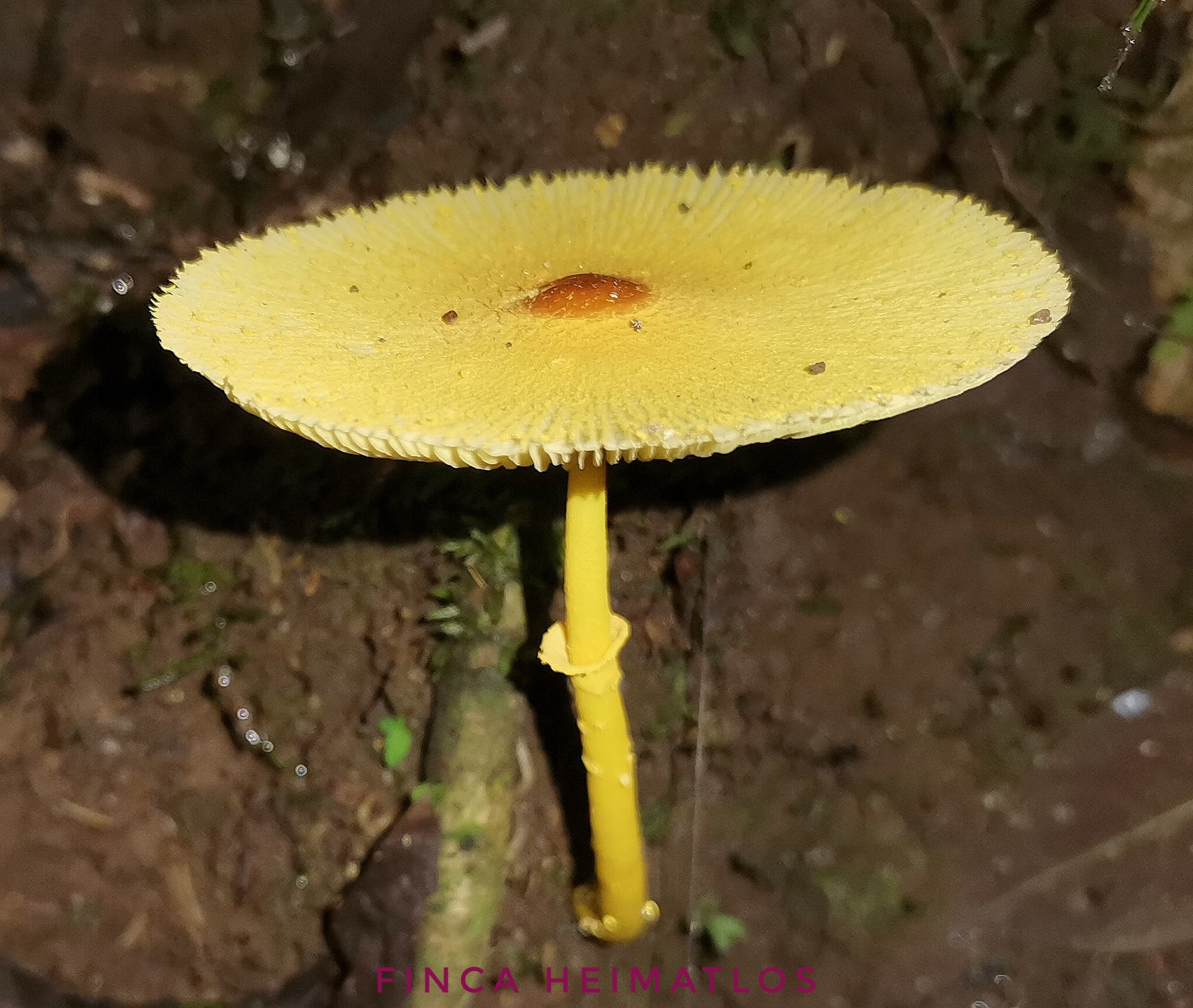

Scientific classification
- Kingdom: Fungi
- Division: Basidiomycota
- Class: Agaricomycetes
- Order: Agaricales
- Family: Agaricaceae
- Genus: Leucocoprinus
- Species: L. brunneoluteus

Binomial name
- Leucocoprinus brunneoluteus Capelari & Gimenes (2004)

= Leucocoprinus brunneoluteus =

Species of fungus

Leucocoprinus brunneoluteus
- Mycological characteristics
- Gills on hymenium
- Cap is convex or flat
- Hymenium is free
- Stipe has a ring
- Spore print is white
- Ecology is saprotrophic
- Edibility is unknown

Leucocoprinus brunneoluteus is a species of mushroom producing fungus in the family Agaricaceae.

== Taxonomy ==
L. brunneoluteus was classified by the mycologists Marina Capelari and Luciana Jandelli Gimenes in 2004.

== Description ==
Leucocoprinus brunneoluteus is a small dapperling mushroom with thin yellow flesh that is superficially similar to Leucocoprinus birnbaumii but with a more distinctly pronounced brown umbo.

Cap: 1.2-4.5 cm wide, subconical when immature expanding to convex and finally planar with slightly uplifting cap margins and a pronounced dark brown umbo. The cap surface is otherwise bright yellow with dark brown scales that become sparser away from the umbo and towards the edges. The plicate-striate striations extend from the margins almost to the centre disc. Stem: 3.5-9cm tall and 2-7mm thick with a slightly bulbous base and tapering at the top of the stem. The surface is the same yellow hue as the cap and gills and the interior is hollow. The yellow-brown stem ring is located towards the top of the stem (superior) however it may disappear with maturity. Gills: Free and remote from the stem, crowded and yellow. Spore print: White. Spores: Elliptical to ovoid with a germ pore. Dextrinoid. 10-12 x 7-9 μm.

It is described as being similar to L. birnbaumii but differing by the distinct brown colour of the umbo as well as the more membranous quality of the mushroom which is similar to the very thin skinned and fragile Leucocoprinus fragilissimus.

== Habitat and distribution ==
L. brunneoluteus has been documented from South America. The specimens studied by Capelari and Gimenes were collected from a state park near São Paulo, Brazil where they were found growing on the ground under Pine trees.

== Etymology ==
The name refers to the colour of the cap and the scales. Brunneoluteus derives from the Latin brunneus meaning dark brown and luteus meaning yellow, yellow-orange.
