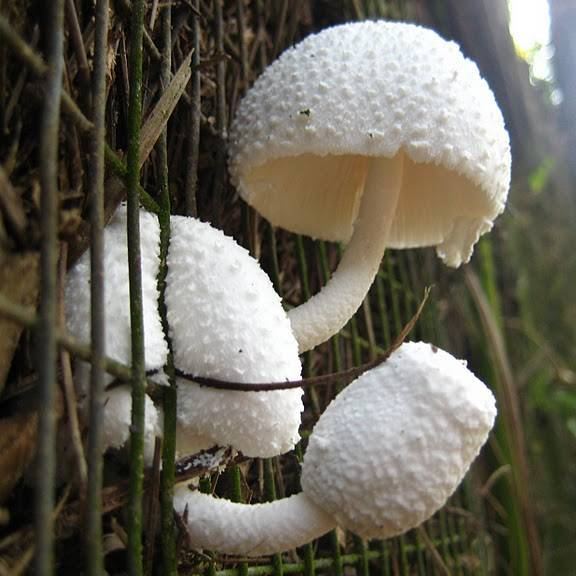

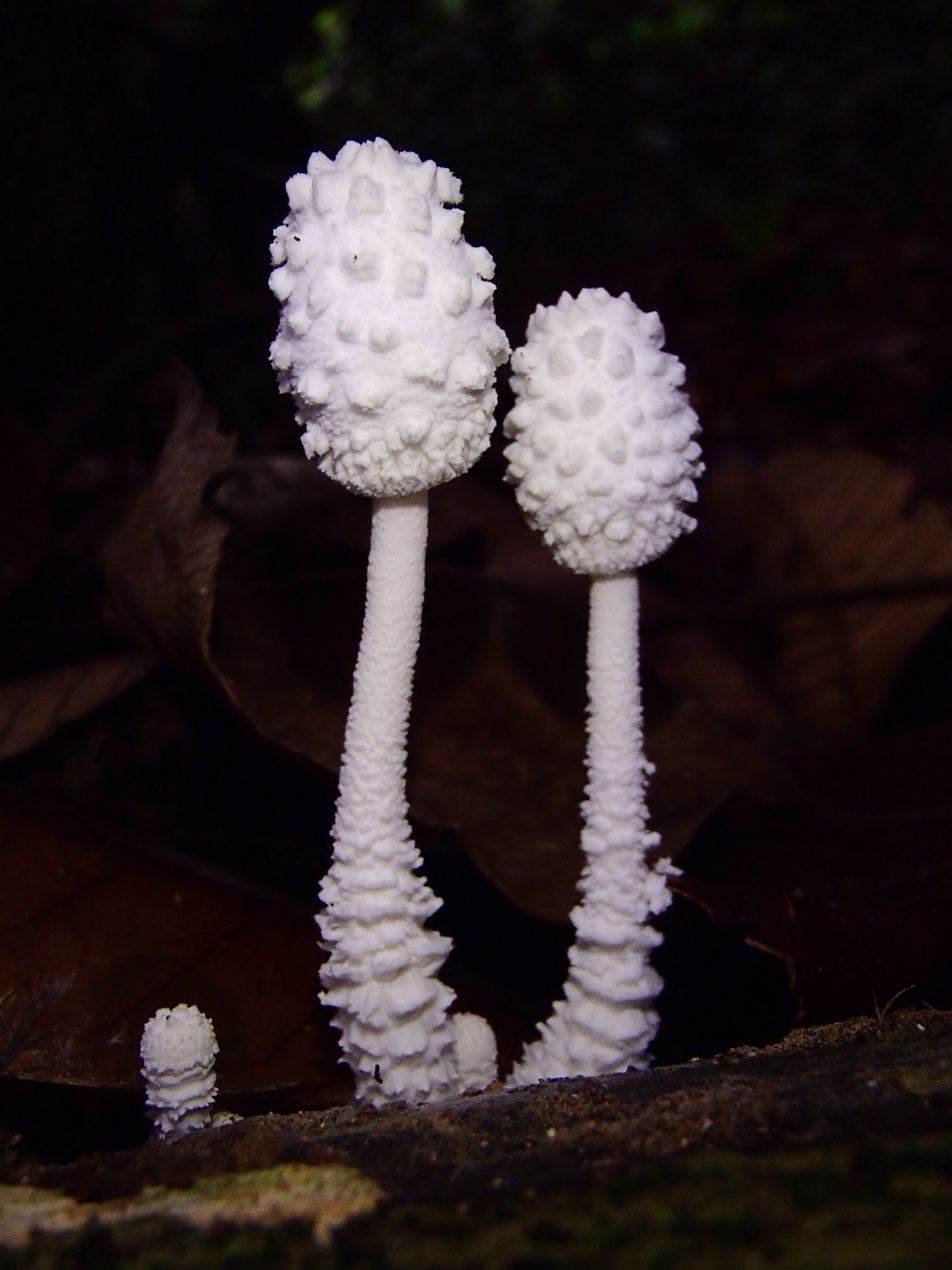
- Immature Leucocoprinus cretaceus mushrooms

Scientific classification
- Kingdom: Fungi
- Division: Basidiomycota
- Class: Agaricomycetes
- Order: Agaricales
- Family: Agaricaceae
- Genus: Leucocoprinus
- Species: L. cretaceus

Binomial name
- Leucocoprinus cretaceus (Bull.) Locq. (1945)

Synonyms
- Agaricus cretaceus Bull. (1788); Agaricus cepistipes var. cretaceus Pers. (1801); Coprinus cepistipes var. cretaceus Gray (1821); Coprinus cepistipes ß cretaceus Gray (1821); Pluteus cretaceus Fr. (1836); Psalliota cretacea P.Kumm. (1871); Pratella cretacea Gillet (1878); Lepiota cepistipes var. cretacea Sacc (1887); Fungus cretaceus Kuntze (1898); Lepiota cretacea Mattir. (1918); Leucoagaricus cretaceus M.M.Moser (1953); Agaricus cretaceus var. ambiguus Fr. (1815); Psalliota cretacea f. grandis R.Schulz (1923); Lepiota cretata Locq. (1950); Leucocoprinus cretatus Locq. ex Lanzoni (1986)

= Leucocoprinus cretaceus =

Species of fungus

Leucocoprinus cretaceus Mycological characteristics
- Gills on hymenium
- Cap is convex or flat
- Hymenium is free
- Stipe has a ring
- Spore print is white to cream
- Ecology is saprotrophic
- Edibility is unknown

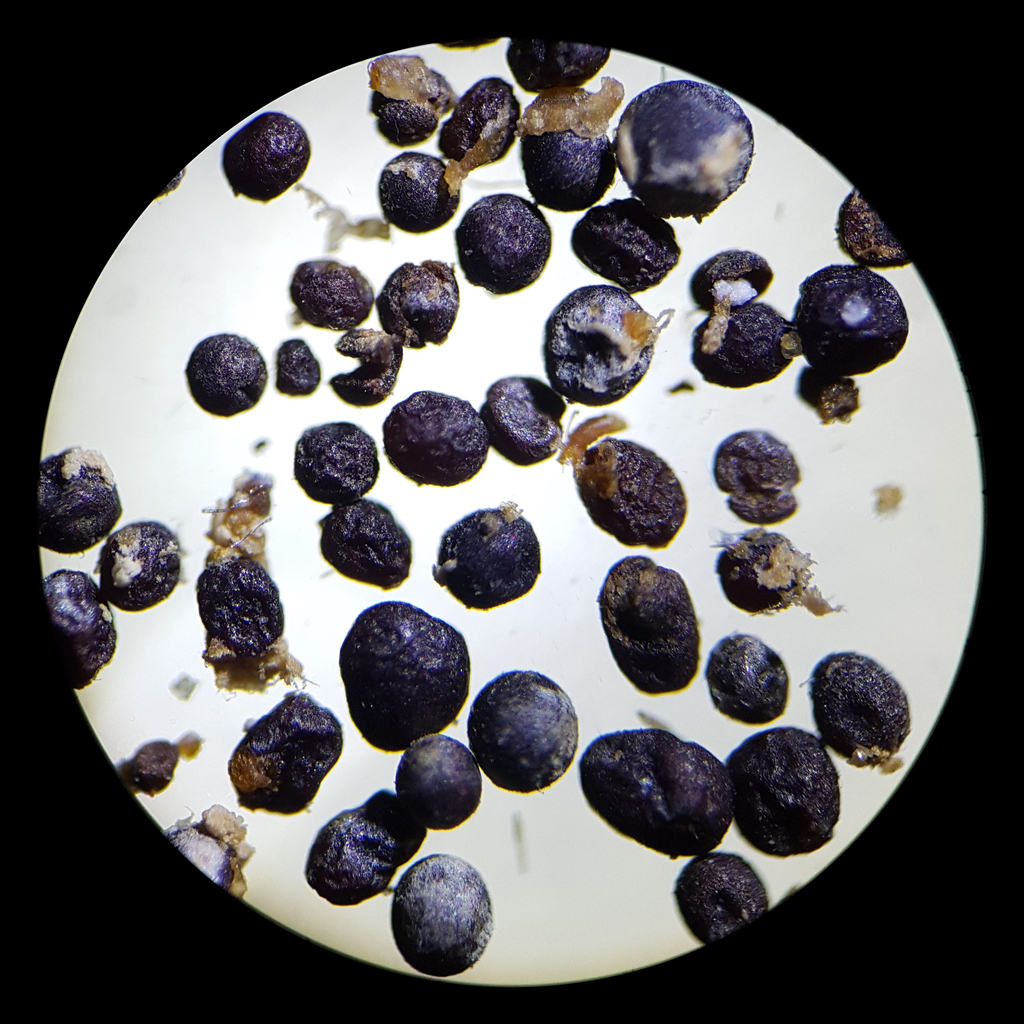
Mature sclerotia of Leucocoprinus cretaceus (40x)

Leucocoprinus cretaceus is a species of mushroom producing fungus in the family Agaricaceae. It is likely tropical in origin although it was first documented in Europe where it was often found growing in greenhouses and bark beds. However many early observations conflate this species with the more common Leucocoprinus birnbaumii or Leucocoprinus cepistipes despite sharing only superficial similarities. This fungus is quite versatile even for a saprotroph and is often found growing in clusters on woodchips, sawdust and compost heaps as well as directly from the ground or on trees. It may also appear in plant pots and greenhouses in colder countries in which it is not well equipped to survive outside.

== Taxonomy ==
The species was first described as Agaricus cretaceus by the French botanist Jean Baptiste François Pierre Bulliard in 1788. Bulliard produced a spectacular illustration of 'L'Agaric Cretacé' in one of his numerous volumes of 'Herbier de la France' and described the mushroom as fluffy and as white as chalk. He noted that the mushrooms appeared in July and August and that he had only ever found them in hot greenhouses and planters under cold frames. He claimed that the mushrooms were very pleasant to taste and smell. His illustration however may be more consistent with Leucocoprinus cepistipes.

In 1801 the German mycologist Christiaan Hendrik Persoon listed Agaricus cretaceus and Agaricus luteus (now Leucocoprinus birnbaumii) as variants of Agaricus cepaestipes noting that one was totally white and the other totally yellow. He also suggested these species might belong in the Coprinus genus noting 'Copr.?' beside the name. In 1821 it was classified as Coprinus cepaestipes var. cretaceus by the British mycologist Samuel Frederick Gray, however Coprinus cepaestipes was erroneously described as 'entirely yellow' and apparently conflated with Agaricus luteus which gray considered a synonym.

In 1836 the Swedish mycologist Elias Magnus Fries described Pluteus cretaceus which he gave the common name Krithvita champignonen which translates as 'chalk white mushroom'. This species is now considered a synonym of L. cretaceus however the description given is quite basic noting only that it is a completely white mushroom with a hollow stem, a ring and no volva. The gills are described as noticeably wide and retain the white colour until the mushroom starts to degrade. Fries says it was tastier than normal mushrooms and found around Lund in Sweden in late Autumn. This species is listed alongside Pluteus campestris and Pluteus bombycinus (now known as Agaricus campestris and Volvariella bombycina) and the section is introduced noting that these edible species have reddish or brown spores but that they do not deliquesce like Coprinoids. From this description it seems doubtful that Fries was actually describing L. cretaceus and more likely that he observed Leucoagaricus leucothites. This species is common in Europe, all white but has gills which discolour pinkish with age whereas the tropical L. cretaceus would likely find the environmental conditions in late Autumn Sweden unfavourable.

In 1871 the German mycologist Paul Kummer described Psalliota cretacea citing as a completely white mushroom usually with a tanned colour to the top of the cap. He suggested the German common name of Kreideweißer champignon which likewise translates as 'chalk white mushroom' and also said this mushroom was edible and tasty. Most of the species in the Psalliota genus went on to be reclassified as Agaricus however and Kummer is describing this species amongst them. So this also seems more likely to be Leucoagaricus leucothites rather than Leucocoprinus cretaceus.

In 1878 the French mycologist Claude Casimir Gillet reclassified Fries' Pluteus cretaceus as Pratella cretacea, and so it is also now regarded as a synonym however Gillet's section on the Pratella species says they have brown or purple-black spores and most of the species he describes as Pratella, many of which with illustrated plates, have also since been classified as Agaricus. Kummer and Gillet described many of the same species with the same names and only the genus they thought they belonged to differed. This species does not appear to be illustrated amongst them however and little description is given besides the gills being white and only turning flesh coloured or brownish towards the end. So Gillet may also be describing Leucoagaricus leucothites. He says the species is edible with a pleasant flavour and that it grows in gardens, vineyards and cultivated fields in France during the Summer and Autumn.

An illustration of this species was included in Mordecai Cubitt Cooke's 'Illustrations of British Fungi' published between 1881 and 1891 with the species name being given as Agaricus (Lepiota) Cepaestipes var. cretaceus.

In 1887 the Italian mycologist Pier Andrea Saccardo classified it as a variant of Lepiota cepaestipes (now Leucocoprinus cepistipes) whilst also describing Lepiota lutea (now Leucocoprinus birnbaumii) as another variant.

In 1889 the French mycologist Narcisse Patouillard included an illustration of Leucocoprinus cepaestipes in his book 'Tabulae analyticae fungorum' stating that the species was found in greenhouses however this illustration appears to actually be depicting Leucocoprinus cretaceus. This highlights the confusion between these two species.

in 1898 the German botanist Otto Kuntze proposed major reclassifications in his book entitled 'Revisio generum plantarum' and suggested that Michel Adanson's pre-Linnaean system genus Fungus should be resurrected for numerous Agaricus and Stropharia species with Fungus cretaceus being one of the new combinations created. Like many of Kuntze's propositions from this book, the idea was not adopted and nothing remains in the Fungus genus.

In 1918 the Italian botanist and mycologist Oreste Mattirolo classified it as Lepiota cretacea. His illustration does look like Leucocoprinus cretaceus though beyond adding a spore size he does not provide a description instead referring to the description of Agaricus (Lepiota) cretaceus written by Carlo Vittadini which Mattirolo describes as like a 'photograph made with words'. Vittadini describes the taste and smell as like that of Pelliccione, an Italian common name for Macrolepiota procera and says the mushroom is suitable for consumption, also saying the gills are similar to Pelliccione. Mattirolo agrees with the similarity being remarkable however it is unclear if he is referencing the gills or the taste and smell as when he says 'which I also used as food' it is not clear which species he is referring to.

In 1945 it was reclassified as Leucocoprinus cretaceus by the French mycologist Marcel Locquin. Despite this seeming to settle the matter this species is still conflated with Leucocoprinus cepistipes due to source material based upon these outdated classifications, sometimes resulting in confusion identifying these species.

In 1953 the Austrian mycologist Meinhard Michael Moser classified it as Leucoagaricus cretaceus however it is currently known as Leucocoprinus cretaceus and it is not unusual to find these species switching back and forth between classifications as Leucoagaricus or Leucocoprinus due to the lack of clear distinction between these genera.

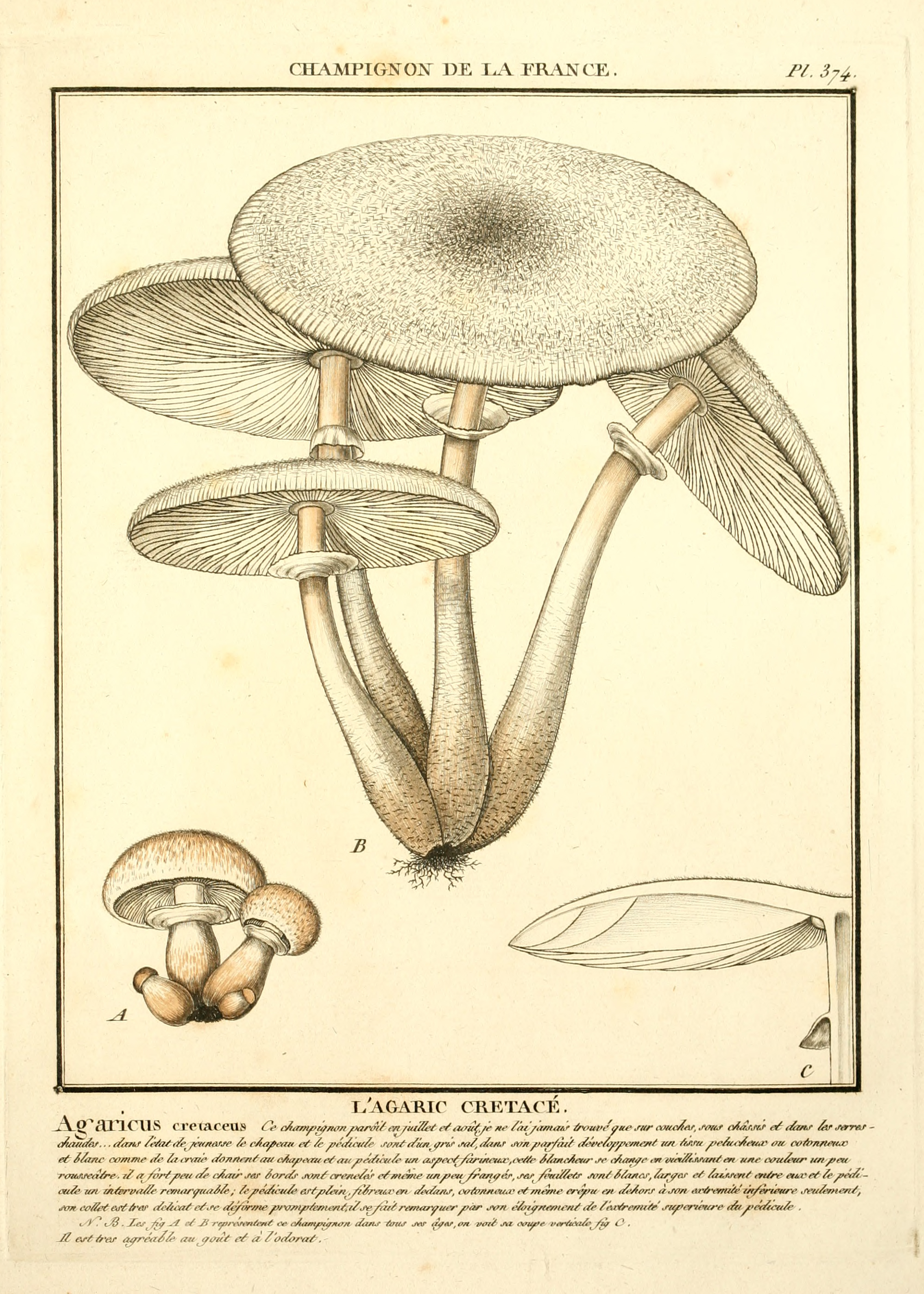
Pierre Bulliard's illustration, 1780 – 1793

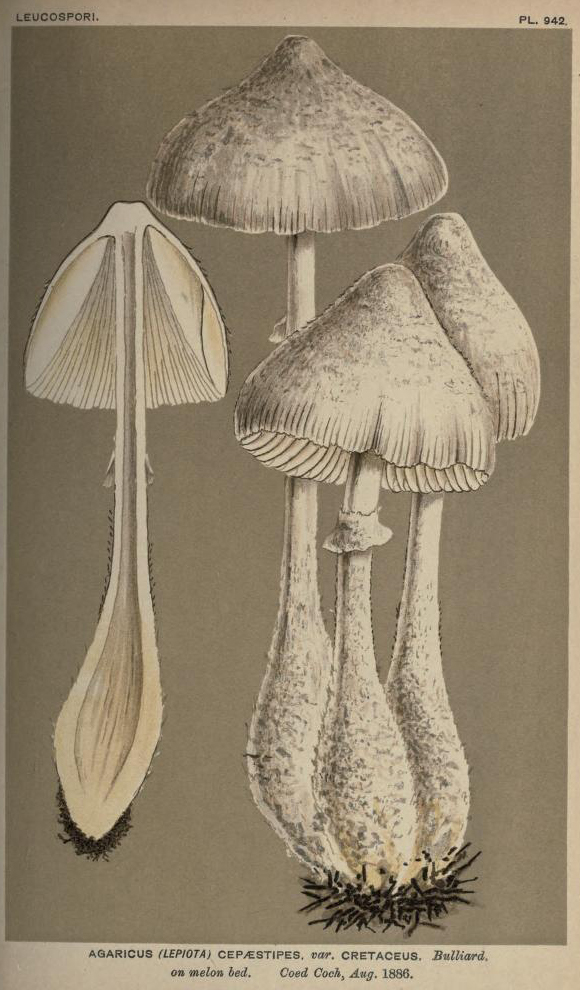
M.C.Cooke's illustration, 1881 – 1891

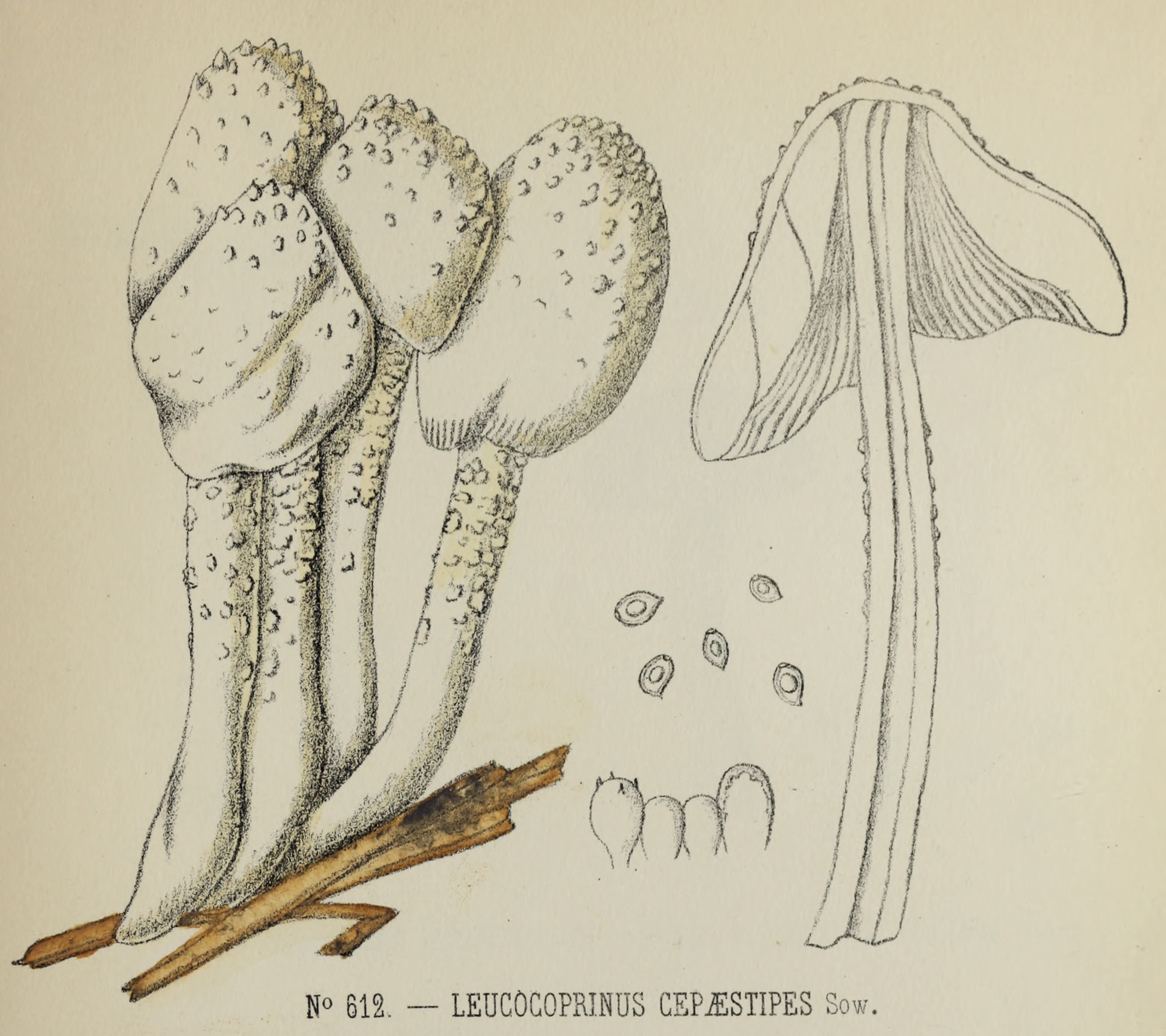
Patouillard's illustration, 1889

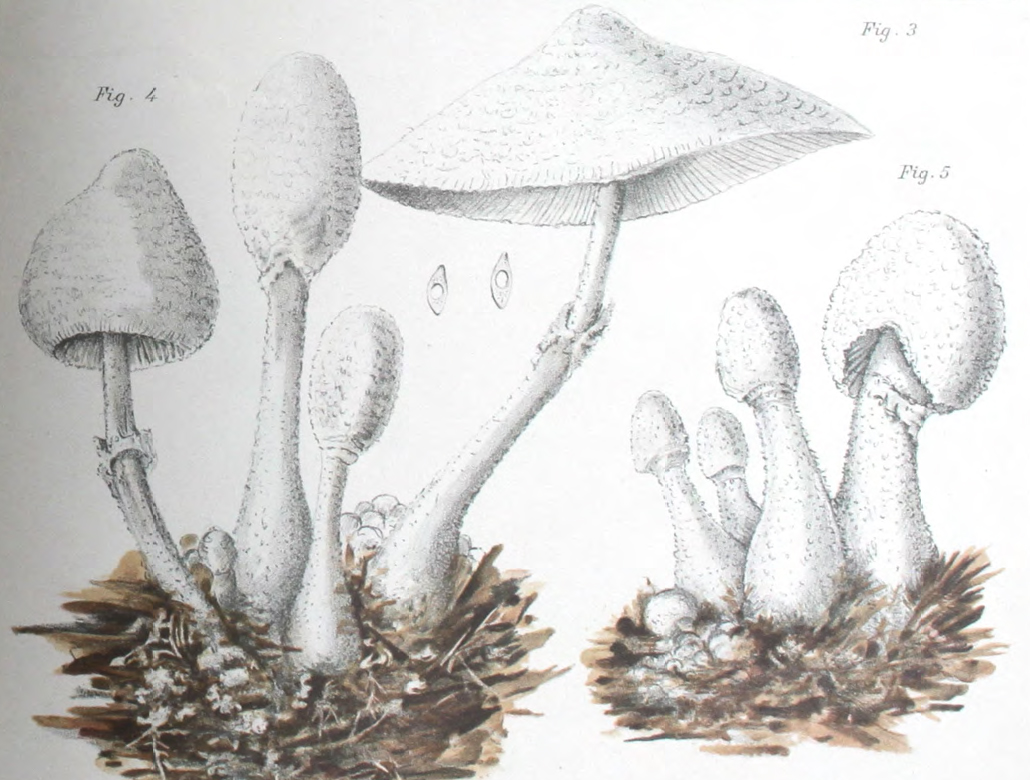
Oreste Mattirolo's illustration, 1918

== Description ==
Leucocoprinus cretaceus is a small dapperling mushroom with white flesh and a distinctively warty cap.

Cap: 2–8 cm. Bulbous when immature becoming convex or flat as it grows and ages. It is stark white and covered in warts. Stem: 3–8 cm in height. 5-10mm thick. Tapers upwards from a swollen base which may exhibit similar warty scales. Fragile stem ring. Gills: White, free and crowded. Spore print: White to creamy white. Spores: Subamygdaliform or Ellipsoid. Smooth with a small pore. Dextrinoid. 6–12 x 4–7 μm. Smell: Indistinct.

Flora Agaricina Neerlandica provides more detail:

Cap: 3.8–9 cm wide, starting hemispherical to convex or conico-convex expanding and flattening with age to become plano-concave with or without a slight umbo. The surface is white and covered with woolly warts and scales (floccose squamulose) with a brownish yellow tinge at the centre of the cap. Gills: White to very pale cream, free and remote from the stem, crowded and very thin. Stem: 2.8–11 cm long and 2–13 mm thick with a bulbous clavate or fusiform base that is 7-19mm thick. The interior is solid but becomes stuffed with age and the exterior surface is white with a slight brownish yellow colour developing with age, more so in the top half. The surface is covered in a minute flocculose or felty coating above the ring with thicker warts below and towards the base. Beneath this covering, which is easily brushed off, the surface discolours yellowish when bruised. The ring is halfway up the stem (median) and is flared to start before becoming pendulous, it is 5-10mm wide and thin with a felt like or submembranous texture, smooth on the upper surface and covered with a minute flocculose coating on the underneath. Spore print: Whitish to cream. Spores: 8–12 x 5.5–7.5 μm or 8.7–10.5 x 5.9–6.8 μm on average. Ellipsoid to oblong or slightly amygdaliform with a thick wall and germ pore. Dextrinoid, congophilous and cyanophilous. Has a pink interior in cresyl blue. Basidia: 18–28 x 8.5–12 μm, 4 spored.

== Habitat and distribution ==
Leucocoprinus cretaceus is documented growing in plant pots and greenhouses and so may have a worldwide distribution in captivity with introduction into the wild being possible where temperatures are suitable for these tropical species. In a 1907 study the American mycologist Andrew Price Morgan documented Lepiota cretacea growing in 'rich soil in gardens' and in hot beds throughout North America.

It is widespread in tropical areas, and has a scattered distribution in South America. Five species of Leucocoprinus collected recently in Northern Argentina and Paraguay were identified. Four of them (L. birnbaumii, L. cepistipes, L. cretaceous, and L. straminellus) were reported for the first time in Paraguay and later, three (Leucocoprinus birnbaumi, L. cepistipes, and L. straminellus) were reported in northeastern Argentina.

== Etymology ==
The specific epithet cretaceus means chalky and comes from the Latin creta for chalk.

== Similar species ==
- Leucocoprinus cepistipes is often confused with this species, especially after rain washes away the distinctive cap features. However they can be easily distinguished by the scaly stem of L. cretaceus vs the smooth stem of L. cepistipes, which often has clear water droplets upon the surface towards the base.
