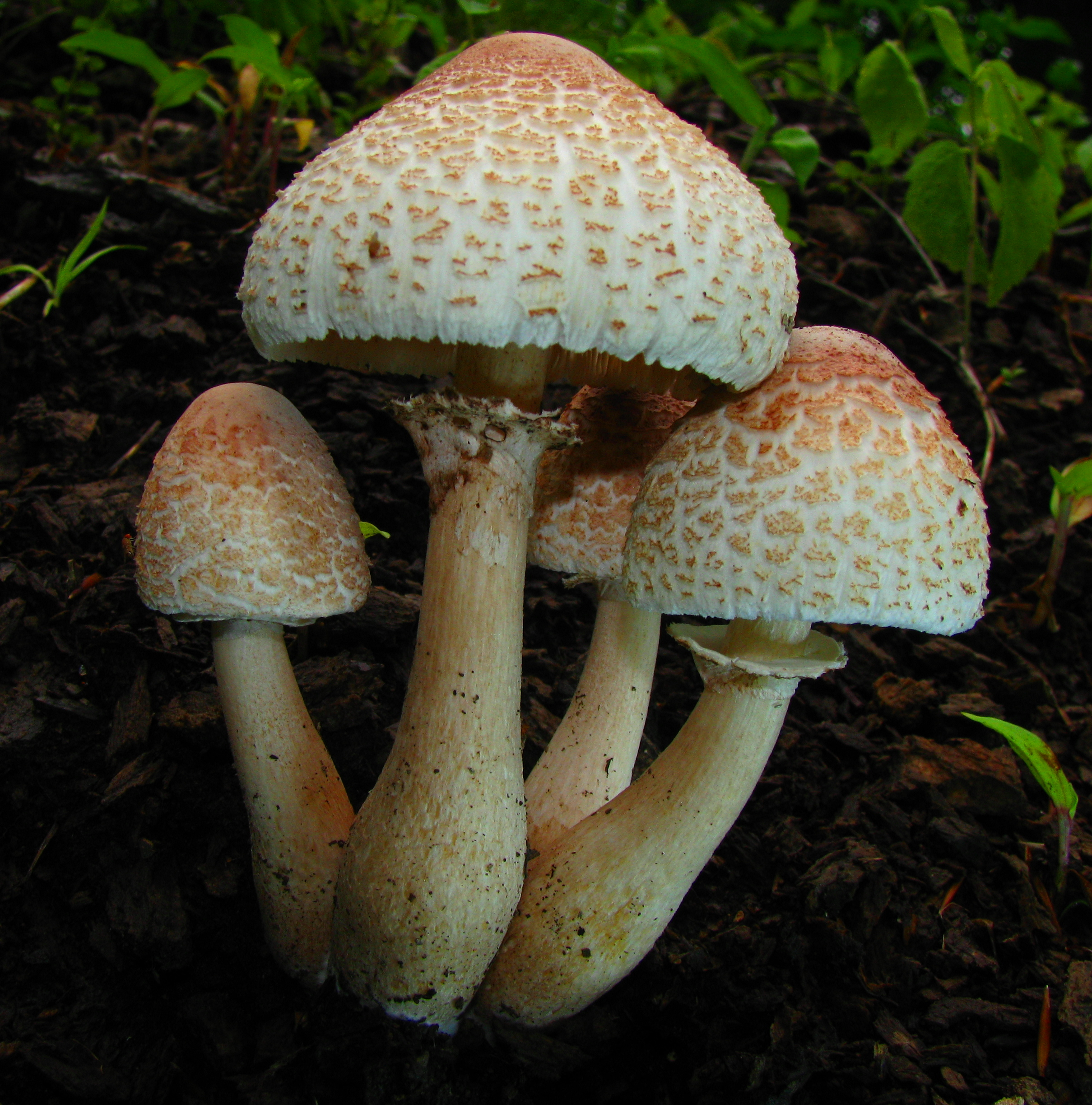
- Leucoagaricus americanus

Scientific classification
- Kingdom: Fungi
- Division: Basidiomycota
- Class: Agaricomycetes
- Order: Agaricales
- Family: Agaricaceae
- Genus: Leucoagaricus; Locq. ex Singer (1948)

Type species
- Leucoagaricus macrorhizus Locq. ex Singer (1948)

Species
- List of Leucoagaricus species

Synonyms
- Attamyces Kreisel (1972); Coccobotrys Boud. & Pat. (1900); Schulzeria Bres. & Schulzer (1886); Sericeomyces Heinem. (1978)

= Leucoagaricus =

Genus of fungi

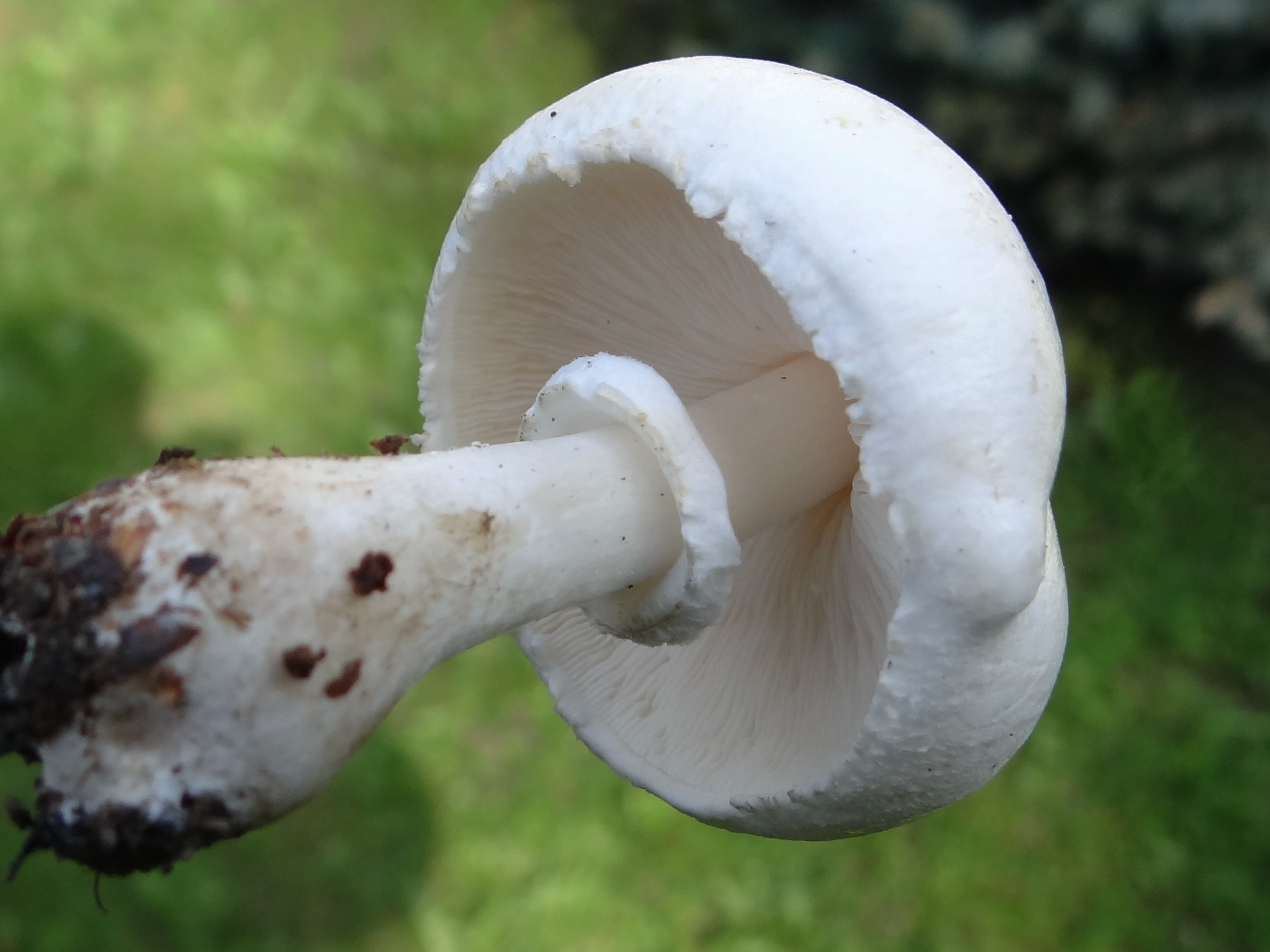
Leucoagaricus leucothites

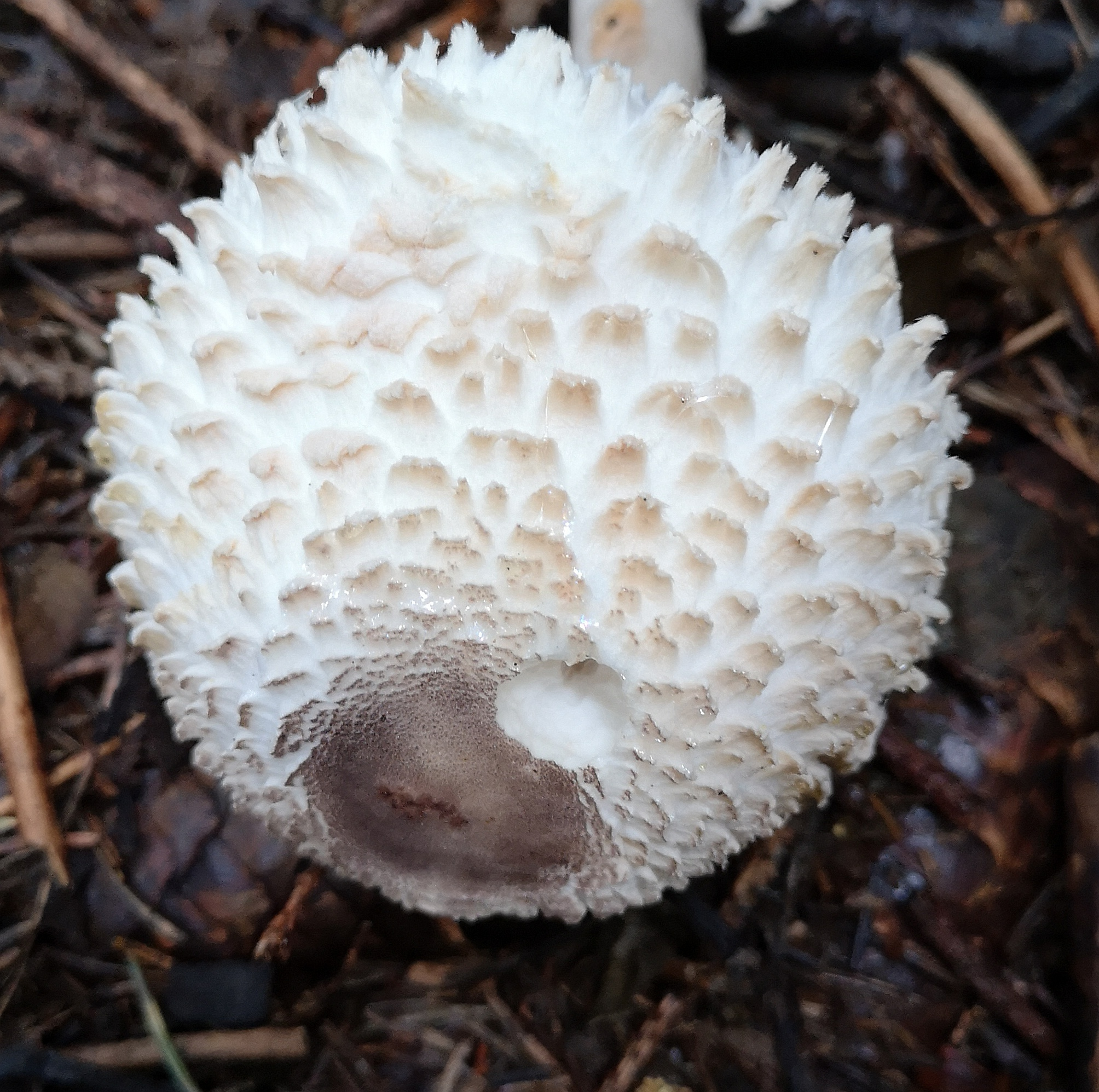
Leucoagaricus nympharum

Leucoagaricus is a genus of mushroom-forming fungi in the family Agaricaceae. As of March 2023 there are over 200 accepted species of Leucoagaricus with ongoing research into the genus adding several more each year. Leucocoprinus is a similar genus and considered by some sources to be indistinct from Leucoagaricus based on genetic data that demonstrates they are monophyletic. Species are separated into these genera based on macroscopic features such as cap striations in Leucocoprinus or the more persistent basidiocarps (mushrooms) of Leucoagaricus as well as microscopic features such as the lack of a germ pore in Leucoagaricus species. As a result of the similarities and disagreement on taxonomy, many of the species within these genera have formerly been classified in the other and may still be known by previous classifications. For instance the species Leucoagaricus gongylophorus is cultivated by fungus-growing ants but was formerly known as Leucocoprinus gongylophorus whilst other species cultivated by the lesser attine ants are still classified as undescribed Leucocoprinus species.

== Taxonomy ==
This group of mushrooms was first defined as a subgenus of Leucocoprinus by Marcel Locquin in 1945, and it was then elevated to the status of genus by Rolf Singer in the journal Sydowia in 1948. The group was characterized as belonging to family Agaricaceae with white, dirty cream or pink spores which are generally small (up to 10 μm) but much bigger in one species, with a germ pore, with a pseudo-amyloid multilayered membrane, simple or ornamented, which is metachromatic in cresyl blue. The hyphae in the sporocarp are without clamp connections. There is always a ring which is initially fixed (but later may be movable).

The type species is Leucoagaricus barssii (Zeller) Vellinga, which was formerly called L. macrorhizus.

The genus Sericeomyces was created in 1978 by the Belgian mycologist Paul Heinemann to accommodate species with a silky covering to the cap with 24 species being placed within this genus having been reclassified from Lepiota. However this classification has since been rejected as phylogenetic data demonstrated they were not distinct from Leucoagaricus.

The genus is further divided based on its morphology with the section classifications:

- Leucoagaricus section Annulati
- Leucoagaricus section Leucoagaricus
- Leucoagaricus section Piloselli
- Leucoagaricus section Rubrotincti
- Leucoagaricus section Sculpturati
- Leucoagaricus section Sphaerocystophori

Starting in 2023, numerous Leucoagaricus species were moved to the Leucocoprinus genus followed by a series of publications in 2024 that moved more species to Leucocoprinus and created the genera Macropsalliota and Candelolepiota.

== Species ==
Select species include:

- Leucoagaricus americanus
- Leucoagaricus badhamii
- Leucoagaricus barssii
- Leucoagaricus erythrophaeus
- Leucoagaricus gaillardii
- Leucoagaricus gongylophorus
- Leucoagaricus leucothites
- Leucoagaricus meleagris
- Leucoagaricus moseri
- Leucoagaricus nympharum
- Leucoagaricus rubrotinctus
- Leucoagaricus sericifer
- Leucoagaricus gujratensis
- Leucoagaricus thallensis
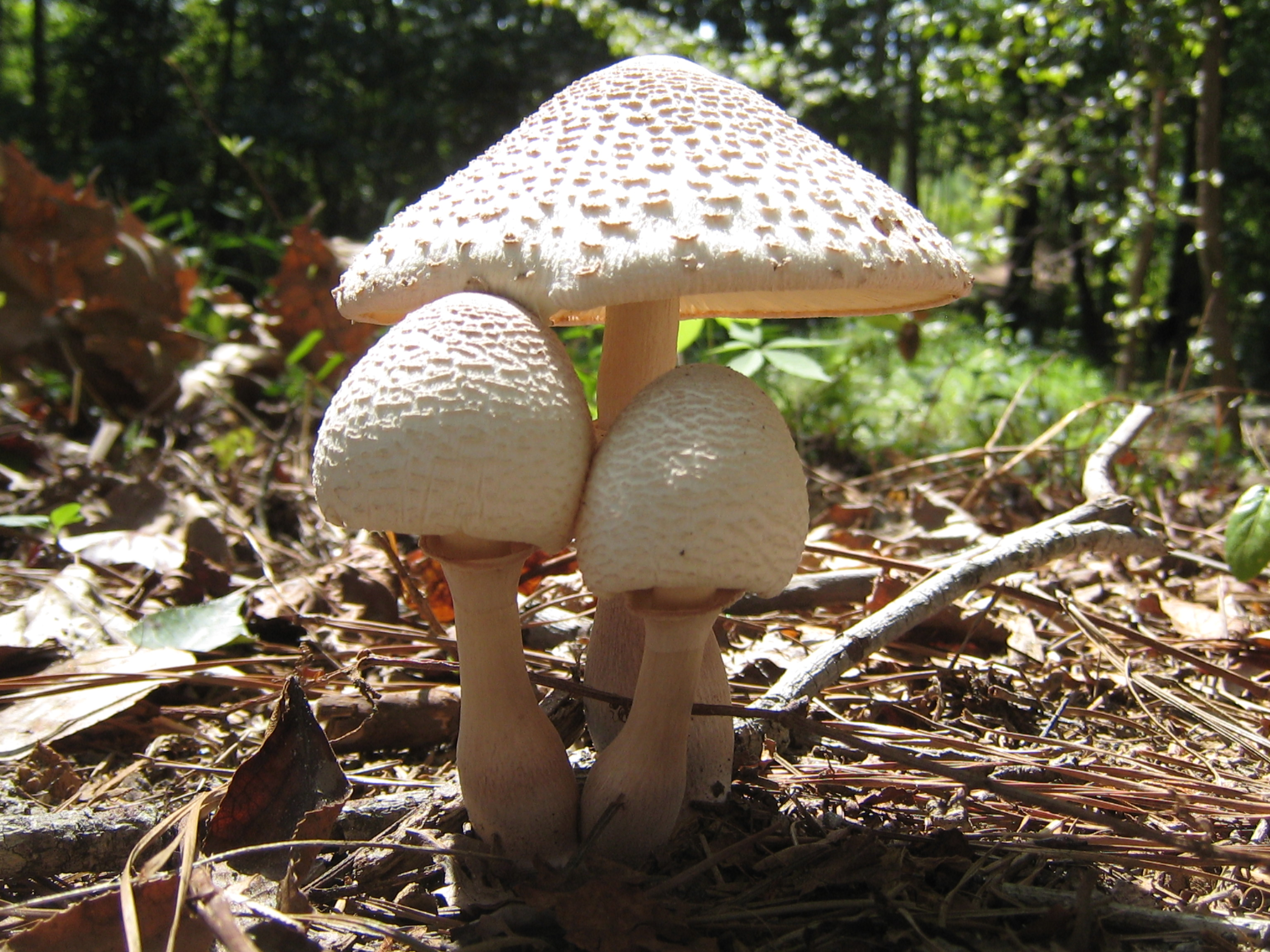
Leucoagaricus americanus

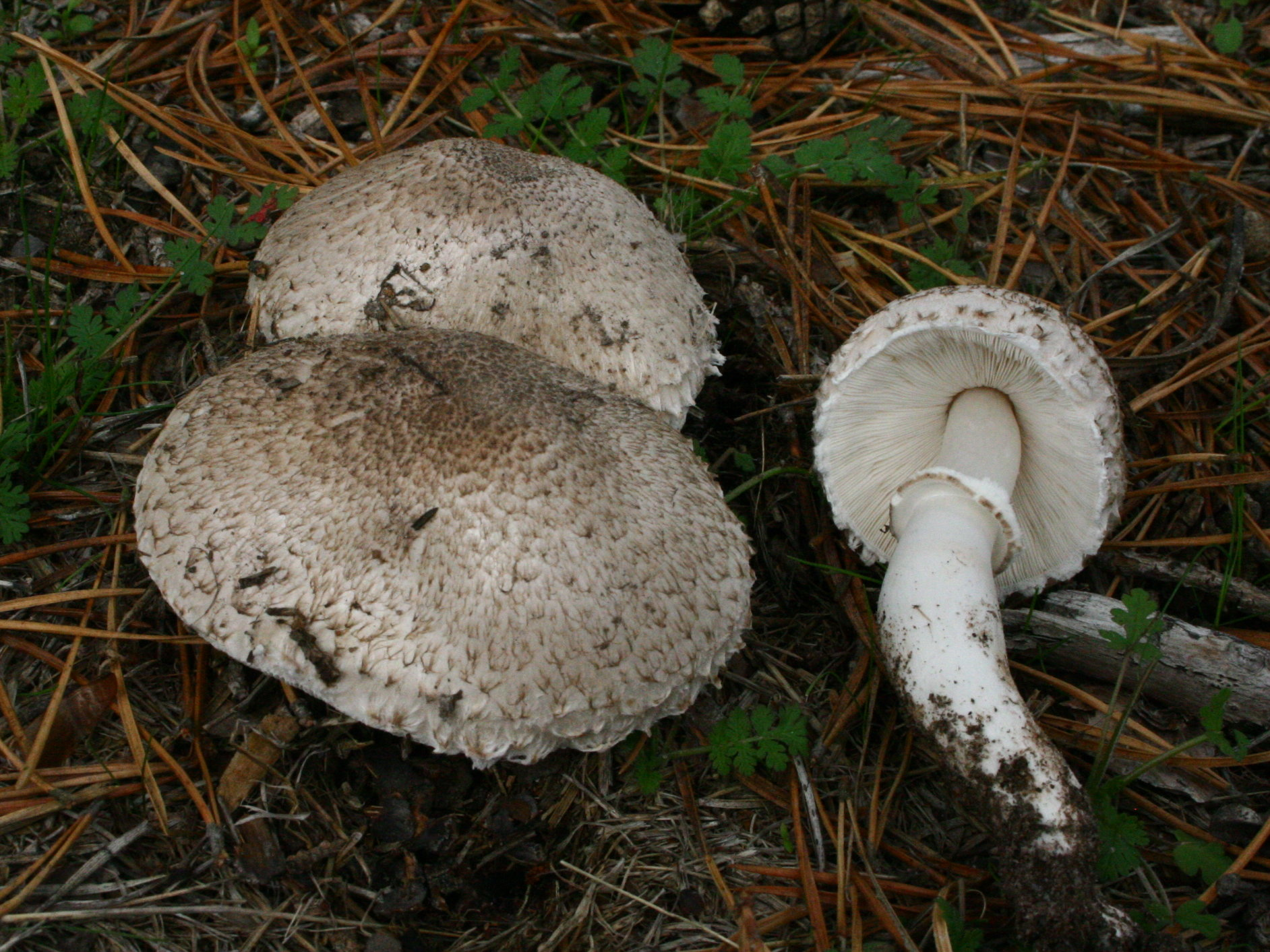
Leucoagaricus barssii

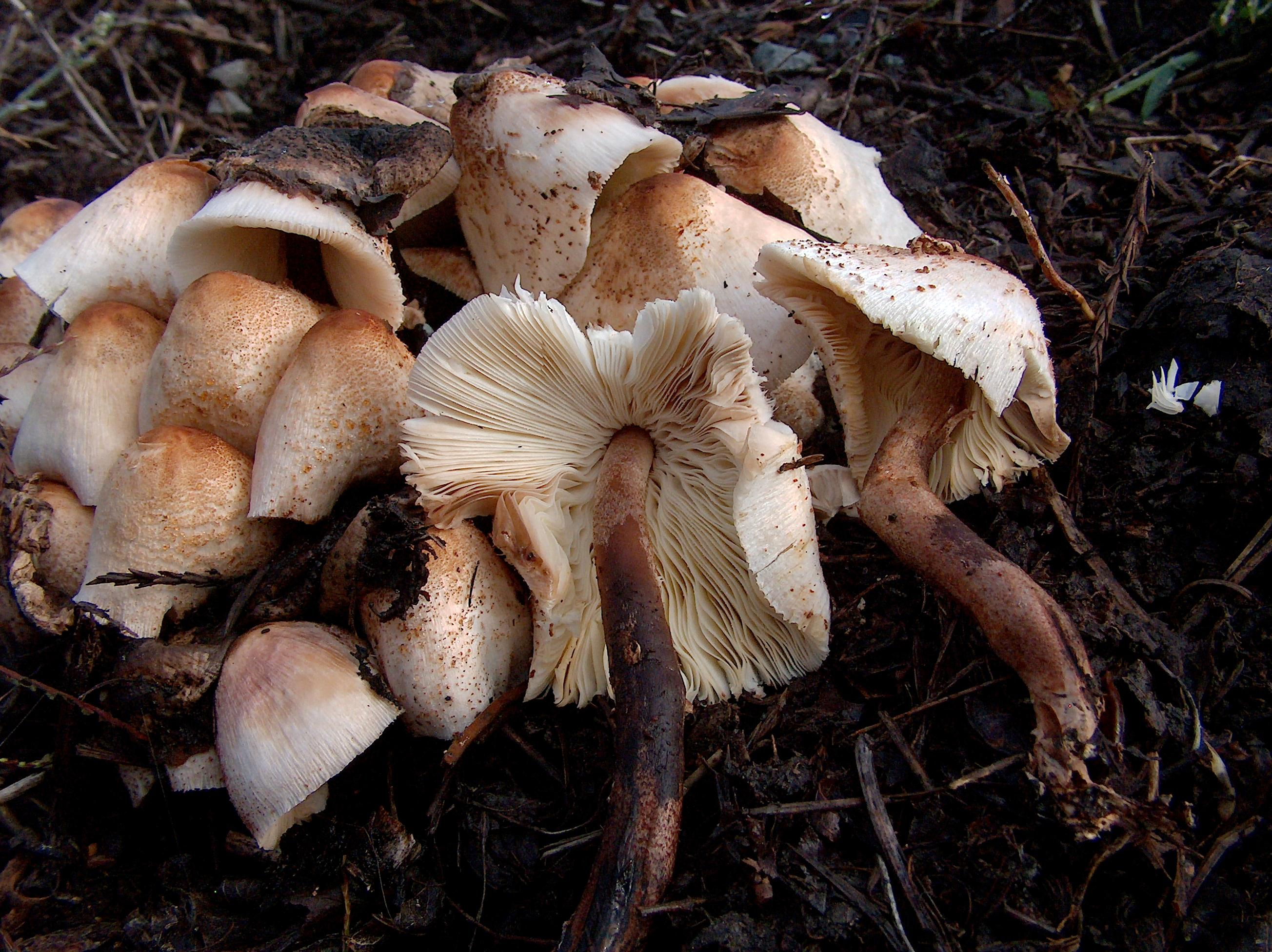
Leucoagaricus meleagris

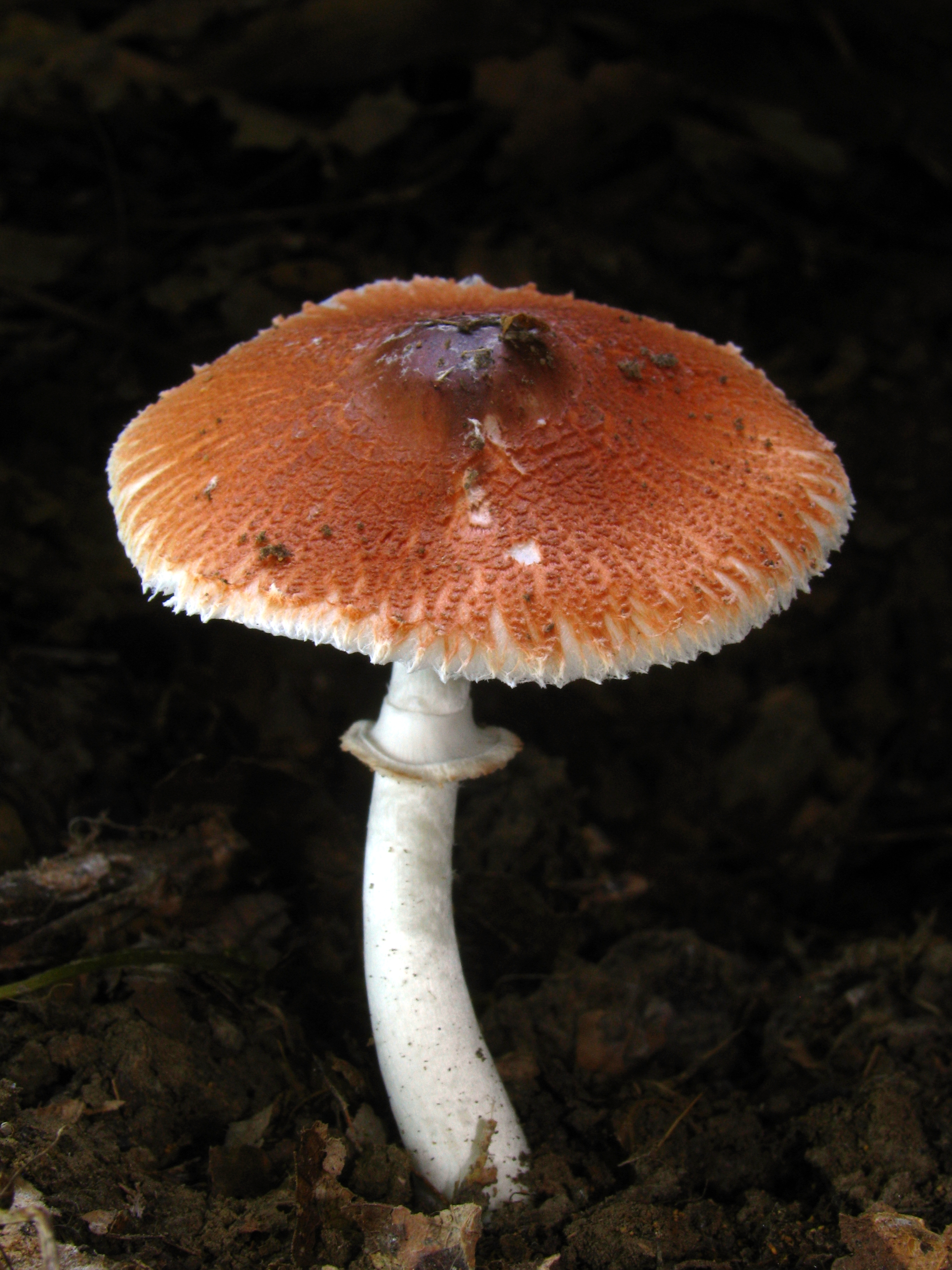
Leucoagaricus rubrotinctus

== See also ==
- List of Agaricaceae genera
- List of Agaricales genera
- List of Leucoagaricus species
