= Leucocoprinus cygneus =

Scientific classification
- Domain: Eukaryota
- Kingdom: Fungi
- Division: Basidiomycota
- Class: Agaricomycetes
- Order: Agaricales
- Family: Agaricaceae
- Genus: Leucocoprinus
- Species: L. cygneus

Binomial name
- Leucocoprinus cygneus (J.E.Lange) Bon (1978)

Synonyms
- Lepiota cygnea J.E.Lange (1940); Pseudobaeospora cygnea Locq. (1952); Cystolepiota cygnea M.M. Moser (1978); Sericeomyces cygneus Heinem. (1978)

Species of fungus

Leucocoprinus cygneus Mycological characteristics
- Gills on hymenium
- Cap is campanulate
- Hymenium is free
- Stipe has a ring
- Spore print is white
- Ecology is saprotrophic
- Edibility is unknown

Leucocoprinus cygneus is a species of mushroom producing fungus in the family Agaricaceae.

== Taxonomy ==
It was first described in 1940 by the Danish mycologist Jakob Emanuel Lange who classified it as Lepiota cygnea until 1952 when it was classified as Pseudobaeospora cygnea by the French mycologist Marcel Locquin.

In 1978 the Belgian mycologist Paul Heinemann created the new genus Sericeomyces in an attempt to better arrange the species which are now recognised as belonging to the Lepiota, Leucoagaricus and Leucocoprinus genera. He reclassified this species as Sericeomyces cygneus but noted that placing it in this newly created genus was questionable. This proposed placement turned out to be short lived as it was also in 1978 that Austrian mycologist Meinhard Michael Moser classified it as Cystolepiota cygnea and the French mycologist Marcel Bon classified it as Leucocoprinus cygneus, which was ultimately the classification which was adopted.

== Description ==
Leucocoprinus cygneus is a small dapperling mushroom with thin white flesh and a white, powdery cap.

Cap: 1.5–2 cm. Campanulate and expanding as it matures. Pure white and slightly silky. Stem: 3 cm tall by 2mm in thickness. Hollow and smooth with a ring. Gills: White, narrow, crowded and free. Spores: Ellipsoid with a tiny germ pore. Dextrinoid. 6.5 x 3.5 μm.

== Etymology ==
The specific epithet cygneus (originally cygnea) derives from the Latin for cygnus meaning swan. This is in reference to the 'swan-like' colour of the cap.

== Habitat and distribution ==
This species is rarely recorded. In the UK only two collections of L cygneus have been documented with one specimen in Kew's collection which was found in West Norfolk and a second in a collection in Edinburgh from a specimen found in South Devon. The first was found growing inside a hollow tree trunk whilst the second was found on damp ground. It is now speculated that the specimen found on the rotting wood may be Leucocoprinus griseofloccosus instead.

== Similar species ==
- Leucocoprinus griseofloccosus
