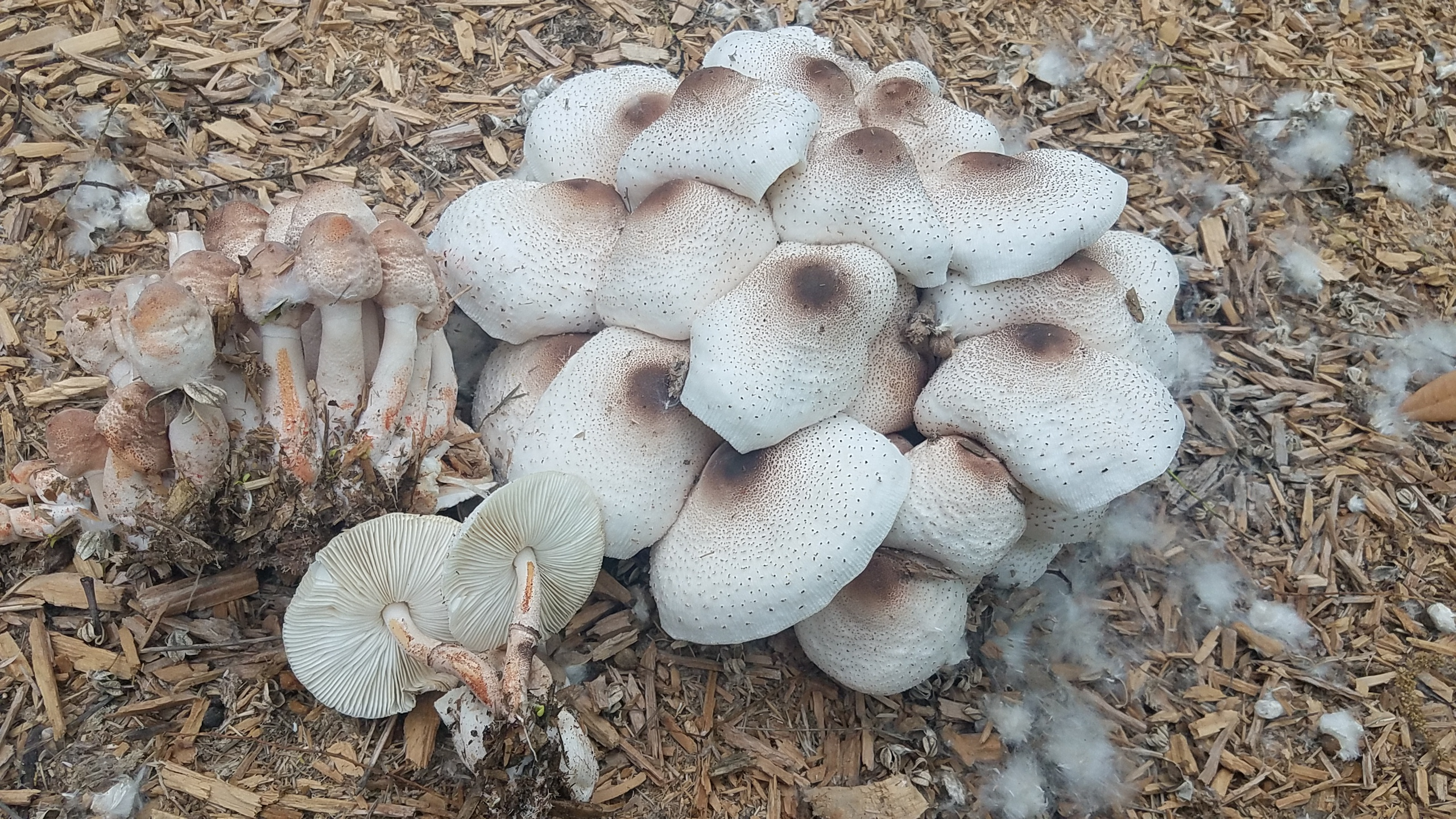

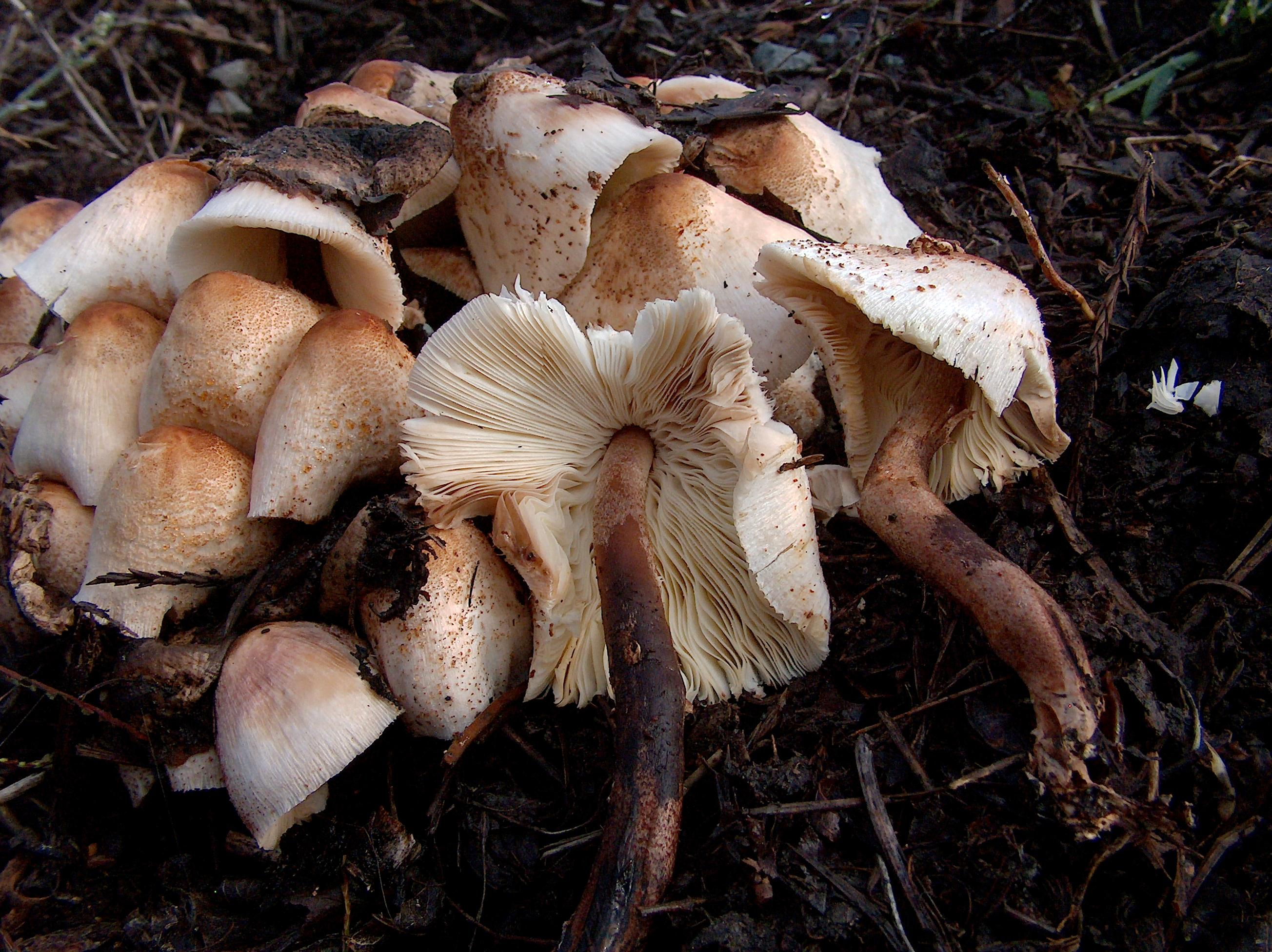

Scientific classification
- Kingdom: Fungi
- Division: Basidiomycota
- Class: Agaricomycetes
- Order: Agaricales
- Family: Agaricaceae
- Genus: Macropsalliota
- Species: M. meleagris

Binomial name
- Macropsalliota meleagris (Gray) Kun L. Yang, Jia Y. Lin & Zhu L. Yang (2024)

Synonyms
- Agaricus meleagris Sowerby (1799); Lepiota meleagris Sacc. (1887); Hiatula meleagris Singer (1936); Leucocoprinus meleagris Locq. (1945); Leucocoprinus meleagris Zschiesch. (1988); Gymnopus meleagris Gray (1821); Mastocephalus meleagris Kuntze (1891); Cenococcum xylophilum Fr. (1829); Cenococcum geophilum var. xylophilum Sacc. (1889); Coccobotrys xylophilus Boud. & Pat. (1900); Lepiota meleagris var. abyssinica Henn. (1891); Hiatula meleagris var. abyssinica Singer (1936); Lepiota meleagris var. congolensis Beeli (1927); Leucoagaricus meleagris Singer (1949) Lepiota meleagris f. brasiliensis Rick (1961)

= Macropsalliota meleagris =

Species of fungus

Macropsalliota meleagris
- Mycological characteristics
- Gills on hymenium
- Cap is campanulate or convex
- Hymenium is free
- Stipe has a ring
- Spore print is white
- Ecology is saprotrophic
- Edibility is unknown

Macropsalliota meleagris is a species of fungus in the family Agaricaceae. It was formerly known as Leucoagaricus meleagris.

== Taxonomy ==
It was first described in 1799 by the British mycologist James Sowerby who classified it as Agaricus meleagris and illustrated it in volume II of 'Coloured Figures of English Fungi or Mushrooms'. Sowerby stated that the specimens were found in a hot-bed by Lady Arden on May 24, 1798.

In 1821, the species was reclassified as Gymnopus meleagris by the British mycologist Samuel Frederick Gray and the common name Turkey-fowl naked-foot was suggested.

In 1887, it was reclassified as Lepiota meleagris by the Italian mycologist Pier Andrea Saccardo.

In 1891, it was included in the German botanist Otto Kunze's exhaustive list of reclassifications as Mastocephalus biornatus, however Kunze's Mastocephalus genus, along with most of 'Revisio generum plantarum' was not widely accepted by the scientific community of the age and so this classification was not accepted and nothing remains in this genus.

In 1936, it was reclassified as Hiatula meleagris by the German mycologist Rolf Singer and then as Leucocoprinus meleagris by Marcel Locquin in 1945. In 1949 Singer reclassified it as Leucoagaricus meleagris.

In 2024 the species was reclassified as Macropsalliota meleagris by the Chinese mycologists Kun L. Yang, Jia Y. Lin & Zhu L. Yang as part of the newly created Macropsalliota genus.

=== Sclerotia ===
Included in the taxonomy of this species by some sources is that of a Cenococcum species which was suspected to be an asexual morph of this species. However, there are issues with these classifications and it is not clear if this species actually produces sclerotia although some Leucoagaricus and Leucocoprinus species do.

In 1829, the Swedish mycologist Elias Magnus Fries described the novel species Cenococcum xylophilum which he described as being similar to Cenococcum geophilum in appearing like small black vetch seeds that are found beneath the soil. The exterior of C. xylophilum was noted as differing in the pale purple floccose (woolly) coating and the white-floury interior.

This was reclassified as Coccobotrys xylophilus in 1900 by the French mycologists Jean Louis Émile Boudier and Narcisse Théophile Patouillard who described the species as having ochre-yellow mycelium producing numerous round, 1-2mm wide structures with a hard outer surface of the same colour as the mycelium. When dissected there is a black layer beneath the exterior and then a red layer of a similar thickness beneath that, finally with a pale ochre centre that may tinge red or become whitish when dry. In this interior section are the sclerotic cells along with short hyphae similar to those surrounding the exterior. The species was found growing amongst tanbark in a hothouse in Angers, France that was growing palm trees.

In 1900, Charles van Bambeke classified Coccobotrys xylophilus as the mycelium and asexual morph of Lepiota meleagris. However the description of Coccobotrys xylophilus given by Boudier and Patouillard appears to significantly differ from that of Fries' Cenococcum xylophilum in colouration. Else Vellinga suggested that the material examined by Boudier and Patouillard and then later Bambeke was not the same as the original collection of Cenococcum xylophilum and so this reclassification had to be rejected. Coccobotrys chilensis however was reclassified as Leucoagaricus chilensis.

The description of the sclerotia given by Boudier and Patouillard may be similar to that of the sclerotia of Leucocoprinus birnbaumii.

== Description ==
Macropsalliota meleagris is a small dapperling mushrooms with white flesh in the cap and brown flesh in the stem.

Cap: 2–4.5 cm wide, starting hemispherical before expanding to campanulate (bell shaped) then plano-convex with a broad umbo. The surface background is white and covered with brownish-red coarse fibrils and scales. The surface discolours to a dirty red with age or when bruised. This can occur just from handling it. Stem: 6–8 cm long with a clavate taper up from the slightly wider base. The surface is white with a fibrillose coating and also discolours brownish-red when old or bruised. The white, ascending stem ring has reddish scales on the underside and is located towards the top of the stem (superior) but it may disappear. Gills: Free, crowded and white but discolouring like the rest of the mushroom so may be yellowish or brownish with age. Spore print: White. Spores: Ellipsoid with a somewhat thick wall and tiny germ pore. Smooth. Hyaline. Dextrinoid. 8-11 x 6-8 μm. Basidia: Four spored. Taste: Slightly farinaceous (floury). Smell: Indistinct.

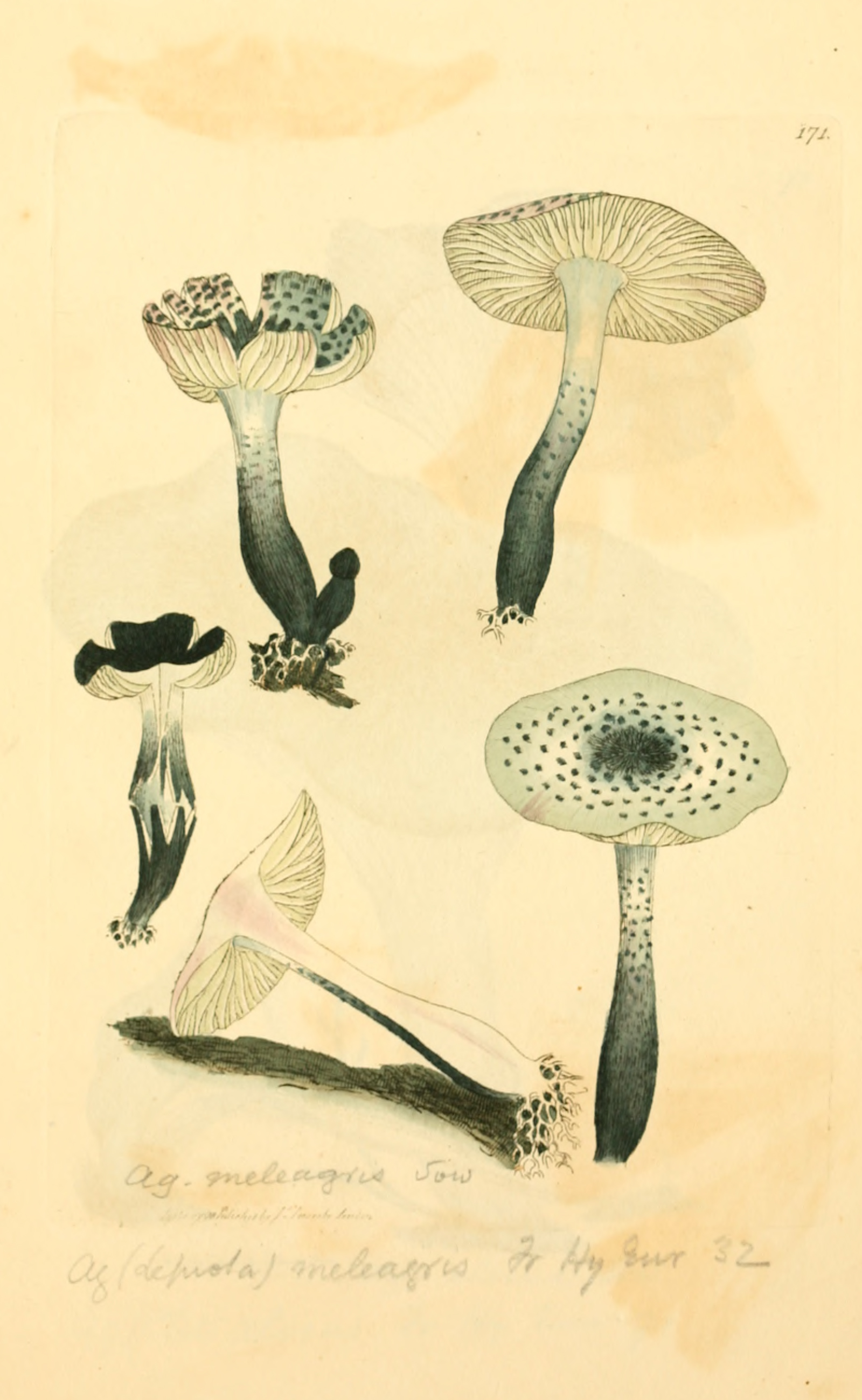
James Sowerby's illustration, 1799

== Habitat and Distribution ==
Macropsalliota meleagris grows in small groups and tufts in the Autumn. It is reported as being widespread but rarely recorded in the United Kingdom. In the early taxonomy of this species the observations are from greenhouses and amongst bark beds in hothouses so it may be more common in these warm environments. It has also been documented more recently from woodchips in England and Skåne, Sweden as well as in greenhouses in Warsaw, Poland. Observations of it appear to be uncommon in Europe with the most common locations for purported observations being the East Coast of the United States.

== Similar species ==
- Macropsalliota americana may appear similar, grow in the same human-made environments and exhibits similar yellow and then red staining when handled. These species may be confused in books. Leucoagaricus meleagris can be distinguished by the smaller size of the mushrooms and different cap surface.
