= Leucocoprinus gandour =

Scientific classification
- Domain: Eukaryota
- Kingdom: Fungi
- Division: Basidiomycota
- Class: Agaricomycetes
- Order: Agaricales
- Family: Agaricaceae
- Genus: Leucocoprinus
- Species: L. gandour

Binomial name
- Leucocoprinus gandour Har. & Pat. (1909)

Synonyms
- Hiatula gandour Sacc. & Trotter (1912)

Species of fungus

Leucocoprinus gandour Mycological characteristics
- Gills on hymenium
- Cap is ovate or campanulate
- Hymenium is free
- Stipe has a ring
- Ecology is saprotrophic
- Edibility is unknown

Leucocoprinus gandour is a species of mushroom-producing fungus in the family Agaricaceae.

== Taxonomy ==
It was described in 1909 by Paul Auguste Hariot and Narcisse Théophile Patouillard who classified it as Leucocoprinus gandour.

In 1912 it was reclassified as Hiatula gandour by Pier Andrea Saccardo and Alessandro Trotter however nothing remains in the Hiatula genus with the majority of the species it contained being now classified as Leucocoprinus.

The French mycologist Roger Heim suggested this species was synonymous with Chlorophyllum molybdites however the Belgian mycologist Paul Heinemann notes that this does not match with the description of the species as it does not mention green gills or truncated spores.

== Description ==
Leucocoprinus gandour is a small dapperling mushroom with white flesh.

Cap: 10-15cm wide, starting subglobose then expanding to campanulate with an umbo. The surface is white with broad 5-10mm concentrically overlapping grey scales and lighter margins. Gills: Free, crowded and white discolouring pale yellowish with age. Stem: 6-10cm long and 12mm thick tapering up from a bulbous base. The surface is white and the interior is hollow. The membranous, persistent stem ring is white and located in the middle of the stem (median). Spores: 6-8 x 8 μm. Globose to ovate with a large oil droplet and appearing yellow when viewed microscopically.

Heinemann improves on the spore description as follows:

Spores: 7.9-8.5 x 6.1-6.7μm. Ellipsoid or oval in profile with a fairly thick membrane without a germ pore or sometimes with an indistinct germ pore. Metachromatic with an orthochromatic wall in Melzer's.

Heinemann's description is based on the examination of the remains of the deposited specimen which consisted of only two gill fragments and a small amount of spores so no description of macroscopic features could be made. However he notes that the spores fit poorly with Chlorophyllum or Macrolepiota and that it is not synonymous with Chlorophyllum molybdites. He suggests the species may belong in Leucoagaricus or possibly may be synonymous with Lepiota ochrospora however that species was found in Guyana, South America whereas Leucocoprinus gandour was found in Africa.

== Etymology ==
The specific epithet gandour is named for the common name of this mushroom in Arabic.

== Habitat and distribution ==
The specimens studied were found in Kindja, west of Iro Lake, near Fort Archambault (now known as Sarh) in the Chari region in Chad, Africa where they were found growing on the ground in June, 1903.

== Edibility ==
Hariot and Patoulliard state that this is an excellent edible species and known by many culinary names including Dé in Kaba, Gandour in Arabic, Kopi mbala in Foulbé and Goko in Banda.

== Similar species ==
Hariot and Patouillard state that Leucoagaricus nympharum appears to be related to this species.
