= Macropsalliota holospilota =

Scientific classification
- Kingdom: Fungi
- Division: Basidiomycota
- Class: Agaricomycetes
- Order: Agaricales
- Family: Agaricaceae
- Genus: Macropsalliota
- Species: M. holospilota

Binomial name
- Macropsalliota holospilota (Berk & Broome) Kun L. Yang, Jia Y. Lin & Zhu L. Yang, in Yang, Lin, Li, Li & Yang (2024)

Synonyms
- Agaricus holospilotus Berk & Broome (1871); Lepiota holospilota Sacc (1887); Mastocephalus holospilotus Kuntze (1891); Leucocoprinus holospilotus D.A. Reid (1990); Leucoagaricus holospilotus Bon (1993)

Species of fungus

Macropsalliota holospilota
- Mycological characteristics
- Gills on hymenium
- Cap is campanulate or flat
- Hymenium is free
- Stipe has a ring
- Spore print is white
- Ecology is saprotrophic
- Edibility is unknown

Macropsalliota holospilota is a species of mushroom producing fungus in the family Agaricaceae.

== Taxonomy ==
It was first described in 1871 by the British mycologists Miles Joseph Berkeley & Christopher Edmund Broome who classified it as Agaricus holospilotus.

It 1887 it was classified as Lepiota holospilota by the Italian botanist and mycologist Pier Andrea Saccardo and then as Mastocephalus holospilotus in 1891 by the German botanist Otto Kunze.

In 1990 it was classified as Leucocoprinus holospilotus by the British mycologist Derek Reid and whilst the French mycologist Marcel Bon classified it as Leucoagaricus holospilotus in 1993 it is the Leucocoprinus placement which is currently accepted in Species Fungorum and Mycobank, though this may be erroneous. This taxonomic history is very similar to other species in the Leucocoprinus and Leucoagaricus genera due to the similarities between some of these species making them hard to place.

In 2024 the species was reclassified as Macropsalliota holospilota by the Chinese mycologists Kun L. Yang, Jia Y. Lin & Zhu L. Yang as part of the newly created Macropsalliota genus.

== Description ==
Macropsalliota holospilota is a small dapperling mushroom with white or pale yellow flesh.

Cap: 3–5 cm wide. Starts bulbous before expanding to campanulate or flat with a slightly raised centre and striations at the cap edges. The flesh is thicker and firmer than similar species and up to 4mm at the centre of cap. The cap surface is white and silky with dark red tones which deepen when dry. It is covered in brownish-purple scales (squamules) which are sparsely scattered at the cap edges and more densely packed together at the centre disc. Gills: Free, crowded, pale yellow in colour and may bruise orange. Stem: 5–11 cm tall and 3–10mm thick sometimes with a slightly wider base. The interior of the stem is white or pale yellow and hollow whilst the exterior is pale brown with fine brownish-purple squamules similar to those of the cap. These occur both above and below the persistent, descending stem ring which is located in the middle of the stem (median). It is white but also exhibits brownish-purple squamules at the edges. Spores: Ovoid to ellipsoid. Dextrinoid. 7–8.5 x 4.5–5.7 μm.

== Habitat and distribution ==
M. holospilota is scarcely recorded, little known and may be confused with numerous Leucocoprinus or Leucoagaricus species.

Its full distribution is unclear however the specimens studied in 1887 by Saccardo were from the Ceylon region of India and found growing on the ground. It has also been found in the Kerala region of India in 2003.
