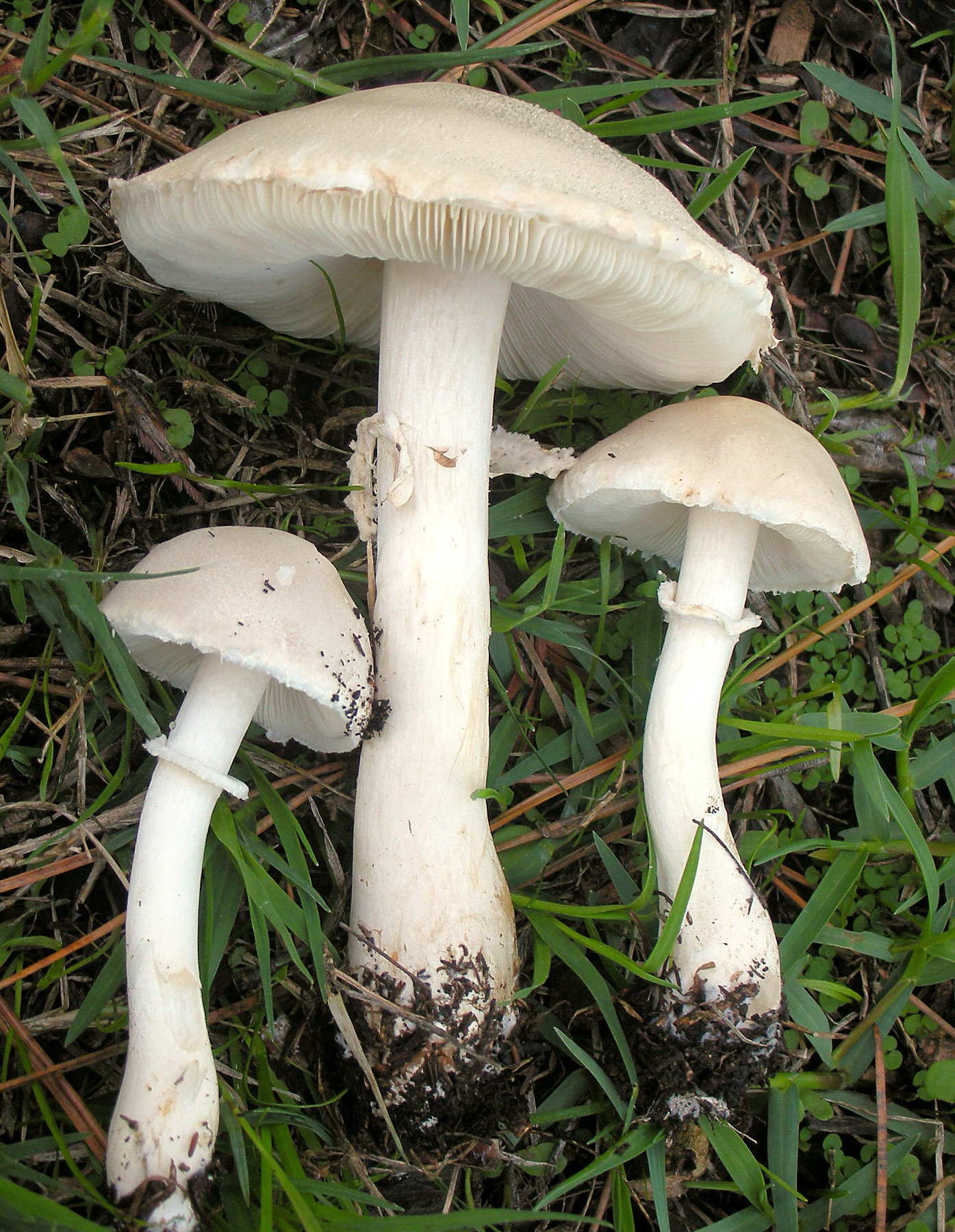

Scientific classification
- Kingdom: Fungi
- Division: Basidiomycota
- Class: Agaricomycetes
- Order: Agaricales
- Family: Agaricaceae
- Genus: Leucocoprinus
- Species: L. leucothites

Binomial name
- Leucocoprinus leucothites (Vittad.) Redhead (2023)

Synonyms
- Agaricus leucothites Vittad. (1835); Lepiota holosericea (J. J. Planer) Gillet (1874); Leucoagaricus naucinus Singer; Leucocoprinus holosericeus (J. J. Planer) Locq. (1943); Leucoagaricus leucothites Wasser (1977)

= Leucocoprinus leucothites =

Species of fungus

Leucocoprinus leucothites
- Mycological characteristics
- Gills on hymenium
- Cap is convex or flat
- Hymenium is free
- Stipe has a ring
- Spore print is white
- Ecology is saprotrophic
- Edibility is unknown

Leucocoprinus leucothites, commonly known as the smooth parasol, woman on motorcycle, ma'am on motorcycle, white dapperling, or white agaricus mushroom, is a species of agaric fungus found in disturbed areas.

== Taxonomy ==
The species was originally described as Agaricus leucothites by Carlo Vittadini in 1835, and bears similarity to species of that genus. Solomon Wasser transferred it to Leucoagaricus in 1977.

In 2023 this species was reclassified as Leucocoprinus leucothites effectively beginning the process of merging the Leucoagaricus and Leucocoprinus genera.

== Description ==
The mushroom's cap is 4 to 15 centimetres (1 1/2 to 6 in) wide, is granular, white or gray-brown in color then sometimes grayish or pinkish. The flesh may bruise yellowish and the gills reddish. The stipe is 5 to 12 cm long, commonly with a wide base, and bruising yellow or brown. A ring is usually present. The spores are white, smooth, and elliptical. They produce a white spore print.

It could be confused for Agaricus species as well as the deadly Amanita ocreata.

== Distribution and ecology ==
Leucocoprinus leucothites has a worldwide distribution with most occurrences in Europe and North America. It can be generally found in disturbed, grassy areas such as gardens and parks, and sometimes in forests.

This mushroom has been recorded as a secondary food source for adults of the pleasing fungus beetle Tritoma biguttata affinis.

== Edibility ==
While sometimes regarded as edible, the species is suspected of being poisonous due to gastric-upset-causing toxins. It could also be confused with a deadly Amanita.

== See also ==
- List of Leucoagaricus species
