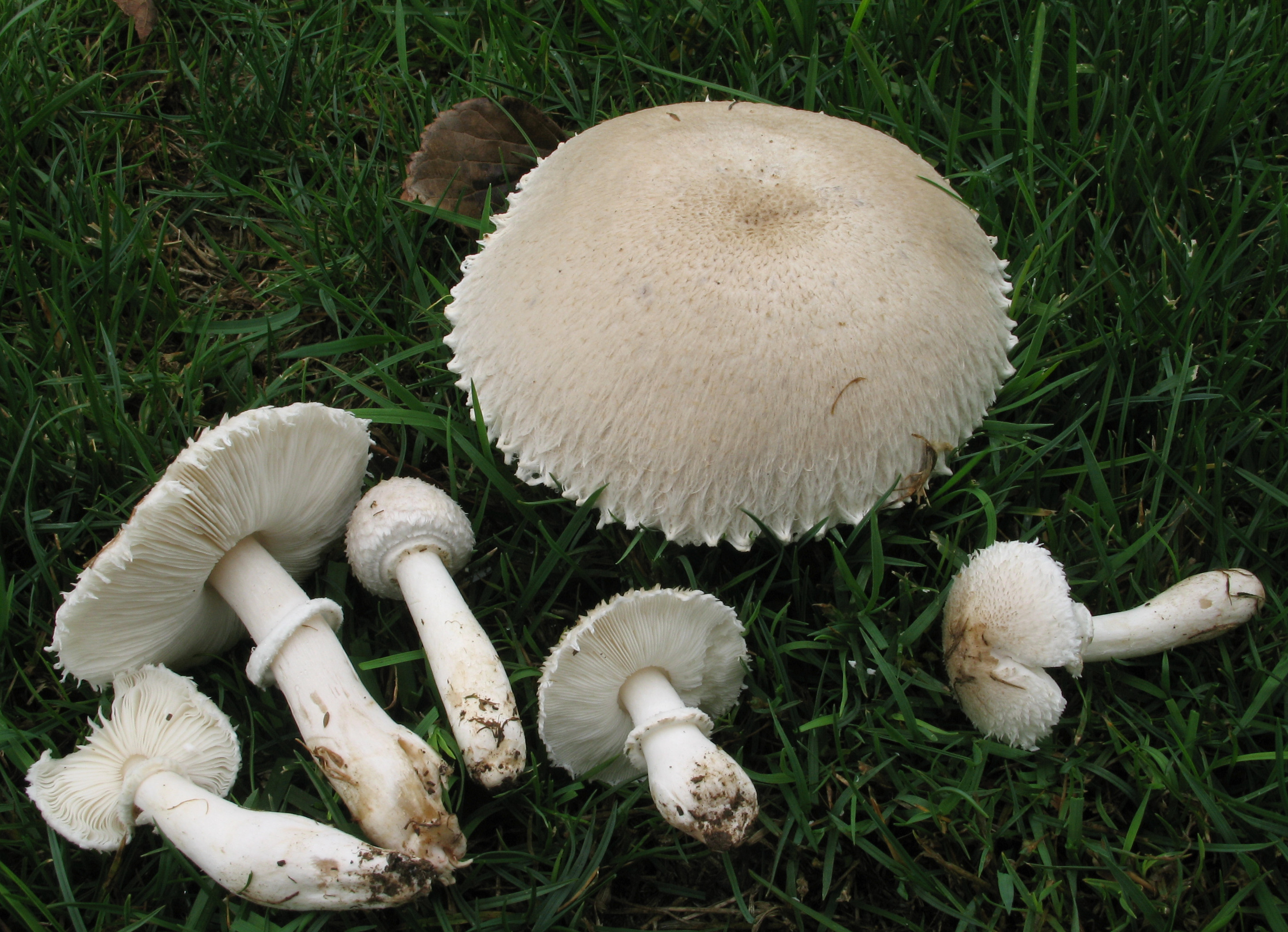

Scientific classification
- Kingdom: Fungi
- Division: Basidiomycota
- Class: Agaricomycetes
- Order: Agaricales
- Family: Agaricaceae
- Genus: Leucocoprinus
- Species: L. barssii

Binomial name
- Leucocoprinus barssii (Zeller) Migl. & Donato (2024)

Synonyms
- Lepiota barssii Zeller (1934); Leucocoprinus macrorhizus Locq. (1943); Lepiota pinguipes A. Pearson (1952); Leucoagaricus pinguipes Bon (1981); Leucoagaricus macrorhizus var. pinguipes Alessio (1988); Lepiota macrorhiza Locq. (1953); Leucoagaricus macrorhizus Locq. (1968); Leucocoprinus macrorhizus D.A. Reid (1989); Leucoagaricus barssii Vellinga (2000) Leucoagaricus barssii var. bulbobasilarus B. Kumari & Atri (2013)

= Leucocoprinus barssii =

Species of fungus

Leucocoprinus barssii, commonly known as the smoky dapperling, or gray parasol, is a species of fungus in the family Agaricaceae.

== Taxonomy ==
Originally classified as Lepiota barssii by the American mycologist Sanford Myron Zeller in 1934 and reclassified as Leucoagaricus barssii by the mycologist Else C. Vellinga in 2000.

The type species of the Leucoagaricus genus, Leucoagaricus macrorhizus was reclassified as Leucoagaricus barssii.

In 2024 the species was reclassifed as Leucocoprinus barssii by the Italian mycologists Vincenzo Migliozzi and Giuseppe Donato.

== Description ==
Leucocoprinus barssii is a large dapperling mushrooms with white flesh.

Cap: 4–8 cm. Starts convex before becoming depressed. May also present as slightly umbonate. It is fibrous with scattered scales. Stem: 4–8 cm. Tapers towards the base and possesses a wide annulus. Gills: White or cream in colour and attached freely with a collar. Spore print: creamy white. Spores: Ovoid and smooth. Dextrinoid. 7-8 x 5-5.5 μm. Taste: Indistinct. Smell: Pleasant and fresh.

== Habitat and distribution ==
L. barssii is reported as being widespread but rarely recorded in the United Kingdom. Observations of it appear to be uncommon in Europe with the most common locations for purported observations being the West Coast of the United States.

Leucoagaricus barssii
- Mycological characteristics
- Gills on hymenium
- Cap is convex or depressed
- Hymenium is free
- Stipe has a ring
- Spore print is white to cream
- Ecology is saprotrophic
- Edibility is edible
