= Leucocoprinus biornatus =

Scientific classification
- Domain: Eukaryota
- Kingdom: Fungi
- Division: Basidiomycota
- Class: Agaricomycetes
- Order: Agaricales
- Family: Agaricaceae
- Genus: Leucocoprinus
- Species: L. biornatus

Binomial name
- Leucocoprinus biornatus (Berk & Broome) Locq. (1945)

Synonyms
- Agaricus biornatus Berk & Broome (1871); Lepiota biornata Sacc (1887); Mastocephalus biornatus Kuntze (1891); Leucocoprinus badhamii subsp. biornatus Locq. (1945); Lepiota badhamii var. biornata Kühner & Romagn. (1953); Leucoagaricus bresadolae var. biornatus Bon (1977)

Species of fungus

Leucocoprinus biornatus Mycological characteristics
- Gills on hymenium
- Cap is campanulate or convex
- Hymenium is free
- Stipe has a ring
- Spore print is white to cream
- Ecology is saprotrophic
- Edibility is unknown

Leucocoprinus biornatus is a species of mushroom producing fungus in the family Agaricaceae.

== Taxonomy ==
It was first described in 1871 by the British mycologists Miles Joseph Berkeley & Christopher Edmund Broome who classified it as Agaricus biornatus.

In 1887 it was classified as Lepiota biornata by the Italian botanist and mycologist Pier Andrea Saccardo and then as Mastocephalus biornatus in 1891 by the German botanist Otto Kunze, however Kunze's Mastocephalus genus, along with most of 'Revisio generum plantarum' was not widely accepted by the scientific community of the age so it remained a Lepiota.

In 1945 it was reclassified as Leucocoprinus biornatus by the French mycologist Marcel Locquin who also classified the subspecies Leucocoprinus badhamii subsp. biornatus in the same year. This is now considered a synonym.

== Description ==
Leucocoprinus biornatus is a small dapperling mushroom with white flesh that may tinge yellow, pinkish or brown.

Cap: 8–10 cm wide with brittle flesh. White and silky but discolouring pinkish with age. Conical when young expanding to convex or campanulate (bell shaped) and becoming irregularly shaped with age but with a persistent umbo throughout. It is covered in light brown woolly scales (floccose or squamulose) which become a darker brown or reddish with age. The cap edges are striated and start white but become pinkish and then brown when bruised or as it matures. Stem: 5–15 cm tall and 2-2.5 cm thick with a bulging centre (fusiform) and slightly bulbous base. White and silky on the outside with white internal flesh that begins solid but hollows with age. The membranous, ascending stem ring is white but bordered by brownish mottled edges. The base is scaly and discolours slightly yellow and then pink or brown with age or with damage. Gills: Free and crowded, swollen in the middle and whitish but turning yellowish with age. The edges are crenelated and tinged brown. Orange-brown or dark red-brown staining is visible when damaged. Spore print: Creamy white. Spores: Elliptical or globose. 10 x 8 μm. Smell: Unpleasantly pungent, acidic and noxious. Taste: Unpleasant flavour similar to that of Lepiota species.

When dry the stem and cap develop a pink or reddish colour.

== Habitat and distribution ==
L. biornatus is scarcely recorded and little known. Berkeley and Broome only say that the specimens studied were found on the ground in Peradeniya, Sri Lanka (then known as Ceylon) in 1868. The majority of the observations documented in their paper (which provide a location) were made there so it is possible that they were in or around the vicinity of the Royal Botanical Gardens, Peradeniya, which were founded in 1843. In their introduction to 'On the Fungi of Ceylon' it is remarked how closely the agarics documented resembled those of species found in Britain.

The specimens studied by Locquin were found growing in clusters (cespitose) or individually on soil in Lyon, France in September 1944.

In 1883 the English botanist and mycologist Mordecai Cubitt Cooke produced illustrations of Agaricus (Lepiota) biornatus in his book entitled 'Illustrations of British Fungi'. The mushrooms were described as growing in 'hot-beds and stoves'. A stove or stovehouse was the common term used at the time to refer to a heated greenhouse, since they were often warmed via the exhaust flue of a wood stove to enable the growing of exotic tropical plants which could not otherwise survive the cold temperatures of Britain.

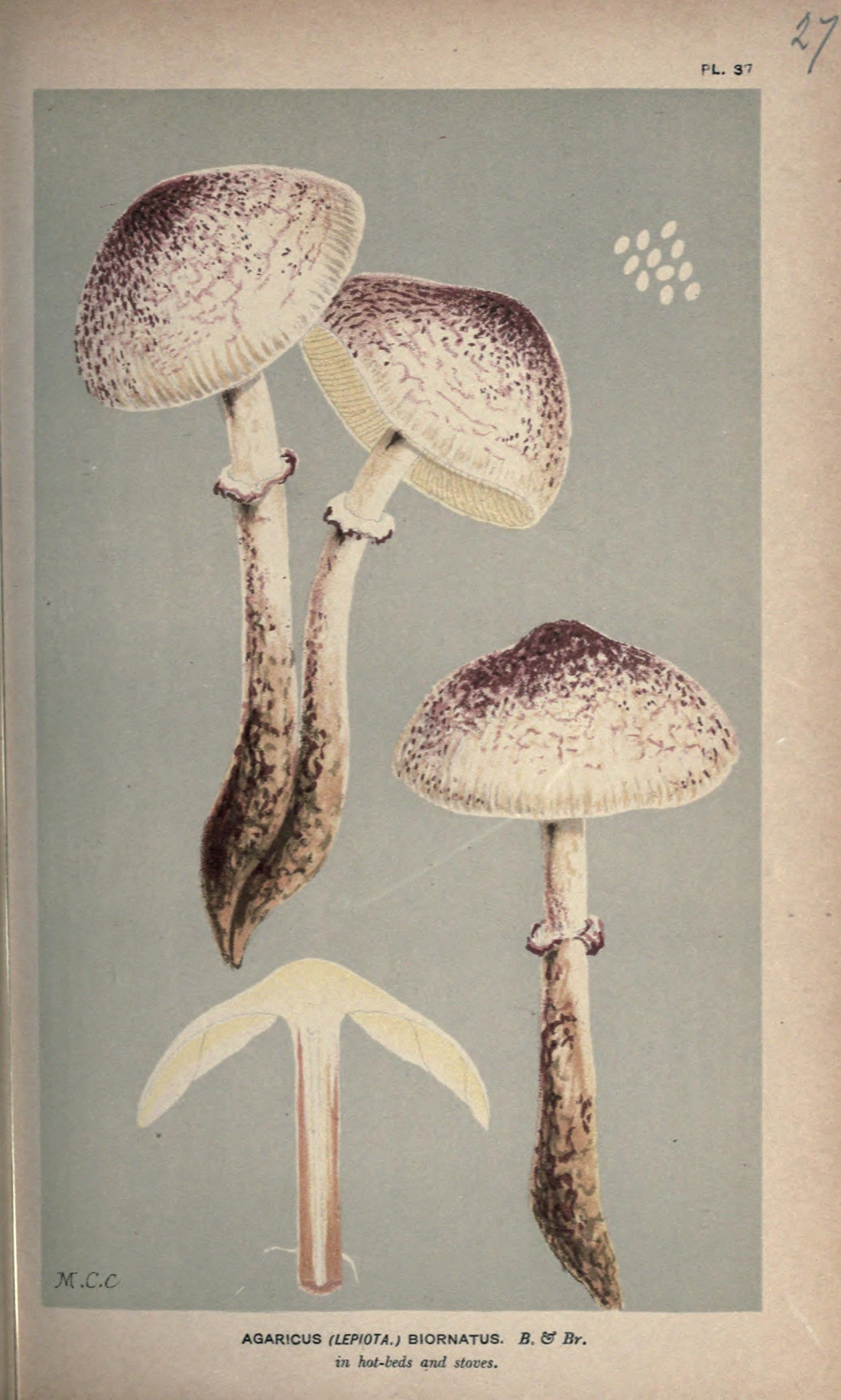
M.C.Cooke's illustration, 1881 - 1891
