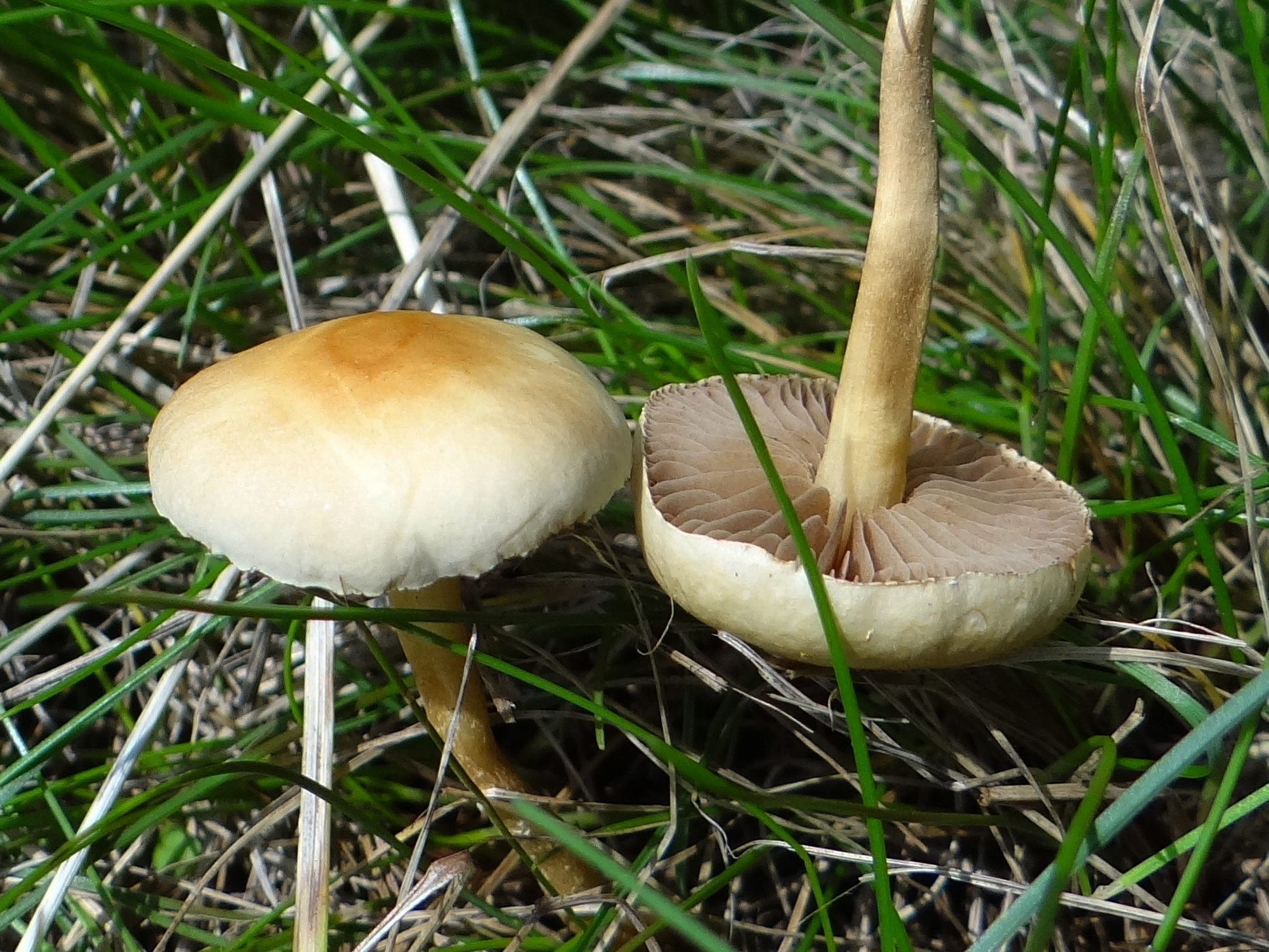

Scientific classification
- Domain: Eukaryota
- Kingdom: Fungi
- Division: Basidiomycota
- Class: Agaricomycetes
- Order: Agaricales
- Family: Hymenogastraceae
- Genus: Hebeloma
- Species: H. pusillum

Binomial name
- Hebeloma pusillum J.E.Lange (1940)

Synonyms
- Hebeloma pusillum J.E.Lange (1938); Hebelomatis pusillum (J.E.Lange) Locq. (1979); Hebeloma pusillum var. longisporum Bruchet (1970)

= Hebeloma pusillum =

Species of fungus

Hebeloma pusillum is a species of mushroom in the family Hymenogastraceae. It is found in Europe.
