= Lepiota ochrospora =

Scientific classification
- Domain: Eukaryota
- Kingdom: Fungi
- Division: Basidiomycota
- Class: Agaricomycetes
- Order: Agaricales
- Family: Agaricaceae
- Genus: Lepiota
- Species: L. ochrospora

Binomial name
- Lepiota ochrospora Cooke & Massee (1893)

Species of fungus

Lepiota ochrospora Mycological characteristics
- Gills on hymenium
- Cap is ovate or umbonate
- Hymenium is free
- Stipe has a ring
- Ecology is saprotrophic
- Edibility is unknown

Lepiota ochrospora is a species of mushroom producing fungus in the family Agaricaceae.

== Taxonomy ==
It was described in 1893 by Mordecai Cubitt Cooke & George Edward Massee who classified it as Lepiota ochrospora.

Paul Heinemann suggested that this species may be synonymous with Leucocoprinus gandour however that species was found in Africa whereas Lepiota ochrospora was found in South America.

== Description ==
Cap: 5–15 cm wide starting ovate then expanding with an umbo. The surface is pale with dark scales which are more dense around the umbo. The cap flesh is 2 cm thick at the disc and thinner at the margin, where there are striations. Gills: Free, moderately broad and ventricose. Yellowish drying to cinnamon. Stem: 6–15 cm long tapering upwards from a bulbous base. The surface has vertical striations running up the length and the interior is hollow. The stem ring is large and movable. Spores: 8 × 6 μm. Ovate and apiculate. Ochre in colour when viewed microscopically. Smell: Pleasant. Taste: Pleasant.

"Reaching to eight inches in diameter, highly fragrant like the best mushroom, and equally edible."

— Mordecai Cubitt Cooke & George Edward Massee, Exotic Fungi 1892-1893, Pg.73

The dried specimen of this species is held by The New York Botanical Garden.

== Etymology ==
The specific epithet ochrospora is named for the colour of the spores of this mushroom.

== Habitat and distribution ==
The specimens studied were found the Coast Lands of British Guiana (now Guyana) where they were found growing on the ground.

== Similar species ==
Cooke and Massee state that it resembles Lepiota procera (now Macrolepiota procera) but that the spores are distinctly coloured like those of Cortinarii (Cortinarius).
