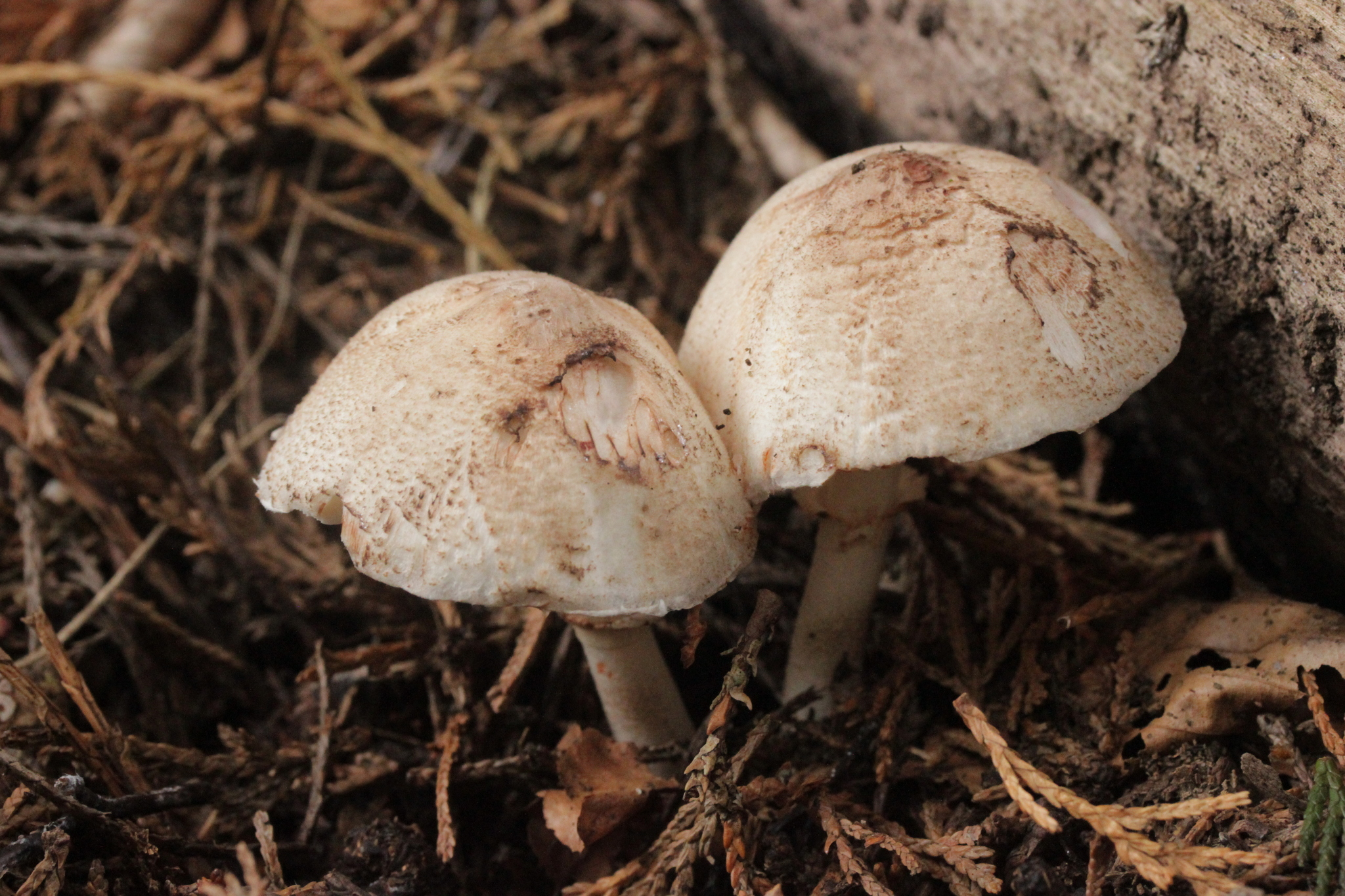

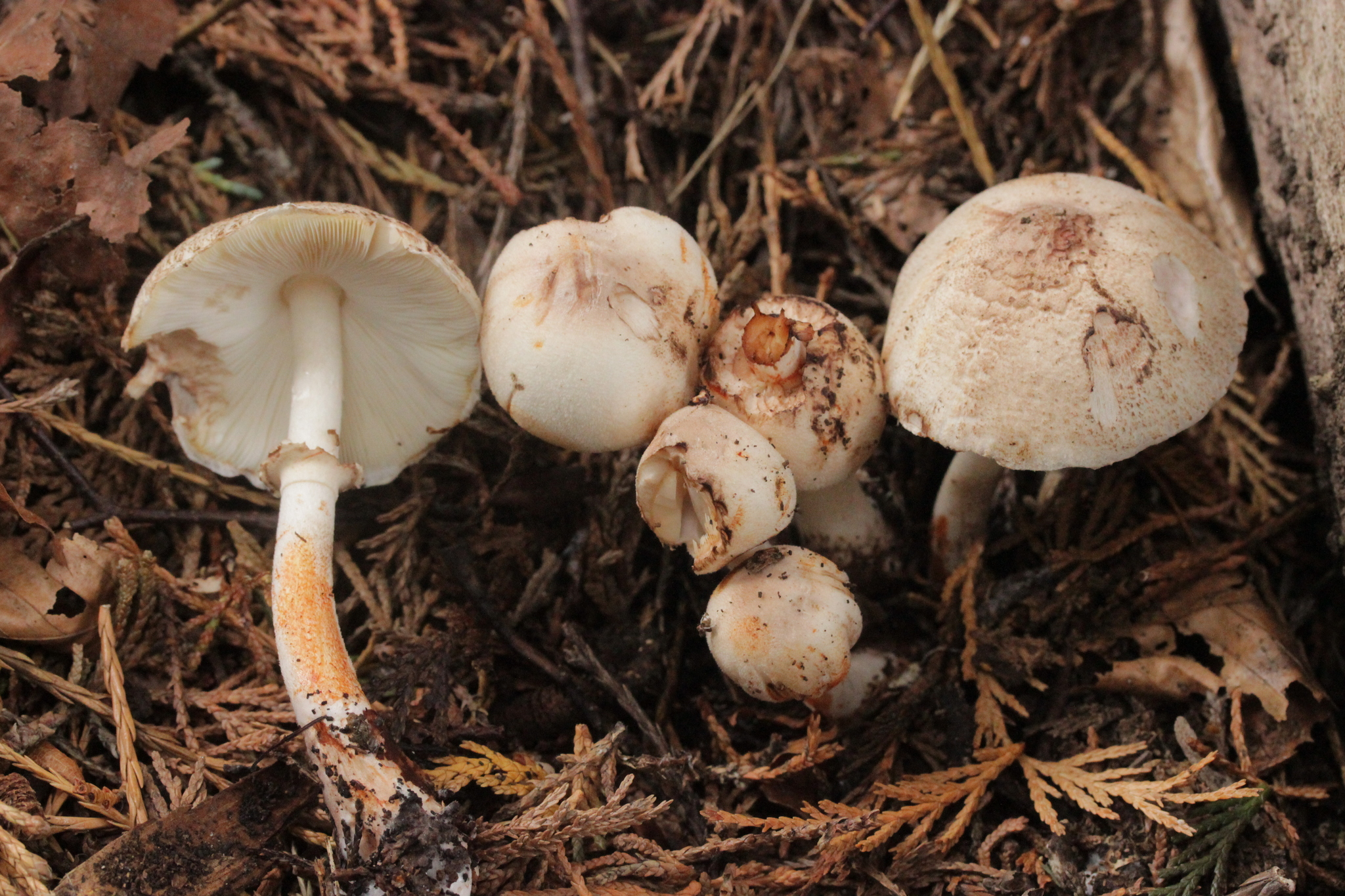

Scientific classification
- Kingdom: Fungi
- Division: Basidiomycota
- Class: Agaricomycetes
- Order: Agaricales
- Family: Agaricaceae
- Genus: Leucocoprinus
- Species: L. badhamii

Binomial name
- Leucocoprinus badhamii (Berk & Broome) Locq. (1943)

Synonyms
- Agaricus badhamii Berk. & Broome (1854); Lepiota badhamii Quél. (1872); Mastocephalus badhamii Kuntze (1872); Lepiotophyllum badhamii Locq. (1942); Leucocoprinus badhamii Locq. (1943) Leucoagaricus badhamii Singer (1951)

= Leucocoprinus badhamii =

Species of fungus

Leucocoprinus badhamii
- Mycological characteristics
- Gills on hymenium
- Cap is ovate or flat
- Hymenium is free
- Stipe has a ring
- Spore print is white
- Ecology is saprotrophic
- Edibility is unknown or poisonous

Leucocoprinus badhamii is a species of fungus in the family Agaricaceae and genus Leucocoprinus. The flesh of this mushroom turns blood red when cut or bruised, hence its common name of blushing dapperling. These damaged areas may eventually turn brown or black and likewise the mushroom may discolour brown or black with age. All parts of the flesh display red staining aiding in identification.

== Taxonomy ==
This mushroom was first described by the British mycologists Miles Joseph Berkeley and Christopher Edmund Broome in 1854 who gave it the name Agaricus badhamii. In 1943 the French mycologist Marcel Locquin reclassified it as Leucocoprinus badhamii and then in 1951 it was reclassified as Leucoagaricus badhamii by the German mycologist Rolf Singer. It remained officially known as a Leucoagaricus species but was often still considered a Leucocoprinus species until 2024 when the genera began to be combined resulting it in officially reverting to Leucocoprinus badhamii.

== Etymology ==
The specific epithet Badhamii is named for the British writer, physician, entomologist and mycologist Charles David Badham, author of the 1847 text Treatise on the Esculent Funguses of England.

== Description ==
Leucocoprinus badhamii is a large dapperling mushrooms with white flesh that readily stains red-brown when damaged.

Cap: 5-8cm. Starts ovate/hemispherical before flattening with a slight umbo before finally becoming slightly depressed. Whitish background with brown to black scales or speckles. Turns red when cut or bruised with damaged areas ultimately turning brown or black. Discolours brown or black with age. Stem: 8-12cm. Tapers upwards from bulbous base with a persistent but fragile annulus. Stains red-brown when touched. Gills: White, free/collared, crowded. Staining red-brown when touched. Spore print: White. Spores: ovoid, smooth, dextrinoid. 6.5-8 x 4-4.5 μm. Taste: indistinct, may turn saliva red. Smell: fruity/acidic.

== Habitat and distribution ==
Like other Leucocoprinus species, L. badhamii is a saprotroph, living on humus rich ground, growing in small groups in deciduous and mixed woodland and may be associated with beech trees. It may also grow on woodchips enabling it to appear outside of forest habitats. It has a widespread distribution and has been found in America, Britain, Europe and Africa but appears to be uncommon.

== Toxicity ==
Marcel Locquin noted that whilst some authors considered the species edible, his personal experiments with consuming the species raw resulted in gastrointestinal issues 12 hours after consumption which included diarrhea and abdominal pain which reached their worst 18-24 hours after consumption and then gradually faded until they stopped completely 8 days later. No vomiting or gastric pain was noted. However he noted that no symptoms occurred after consuming mushrooms which had been dried in the oven so concluded that toxins were destroyed by heat. Locquin also noted that he was unaffected by the toxic species Agaricus xanthodermus and so may not have been sensitive to toxins of mushrooms in this family.

== Similar species ==
Leucocoprinus erythrophaeus exhibits similar red staining.

== See also ==
- List of Leucocoprinus species
