= Leucocoprinus griseofloccosus =

Scientific classification
- Domain: Eukaryota
- Kingdom: Fungi
- Division: Basidiomycota
- Class: Agaricomycetes
- Order: Agaricales
- Family: Agaricaceae
- Genus: Leucocoprinus
- Species: L. griseofloccosus

Binomial name
- Leucocoprinus griseofloccosus Lagardère & Eyssart. (2018)

Species of fungus

Leucocoprinus griseofloccosus Mycological characteristics
- Gills on hymenium
- Cap is convex
- Hymenium is free
- Stipe has a ring
- Spore print is white
- Ecology is saprotrophic
- Edibility is unknown

Leucocoprinus griseofloccosus is a species of mushroom producing fungus in the family Agaricaceae.

== Taxonomy ==
It was first described in 2018 by the French mycologists Vincent Lagardère & Guillaume Eyssartier from specimens found in 2017 in Mouréou, Arengosse in the South West Landes region of France. It was noted to be similar in appearance to Leucocoprinus cygneus with previous observations likely being confused with this species however it is differentiated from it by the grey flaky cap whilst L. cygneus is described as pure white and powdery.

== Description ==
Leucocoprinus griseofloccosus is a small dapperling mushroom with thin white flesh.

Cap: Up to 1 cm. Quickly opens to convex with a very slight white or greyish umbo. Stem: 0.5-1.5 x 0.1-0.2 cm. Wider at the base. White with a thin stem ring that is tinged with grey at the edges. Gills: White, crowded, free with a powdery edge. Spores: Elliptical with a tiny germ pore. Dextrinoid. 5.5 - 6.3 x 3.3 - 3.8 μm. Smell: Faint.

== Habitat and distribution ==
The specimens in France were found growing within rotting alder trunks beside a stream in mixed woodland. The woodland was located on clay rich soil within an ericaceous heath.

In November 2019 it was found in the UK for the first time with specimens observed to be growing in rotten Douglas fir logs at the New Forest Reptile Centre near Lyndhurst, South Hampshire. Another observation was made in October 2020 on rotting pine logs in Marlhill copse near Southampton airport.

== Etymology ==
The specific epithet griseofloccosus is derived from the Latin griseus meaning grey and floccosus meaning flaky. This is a reference to the colour and texture of the veil.

== Similar species ==
- Leucocoprinus cygneus
