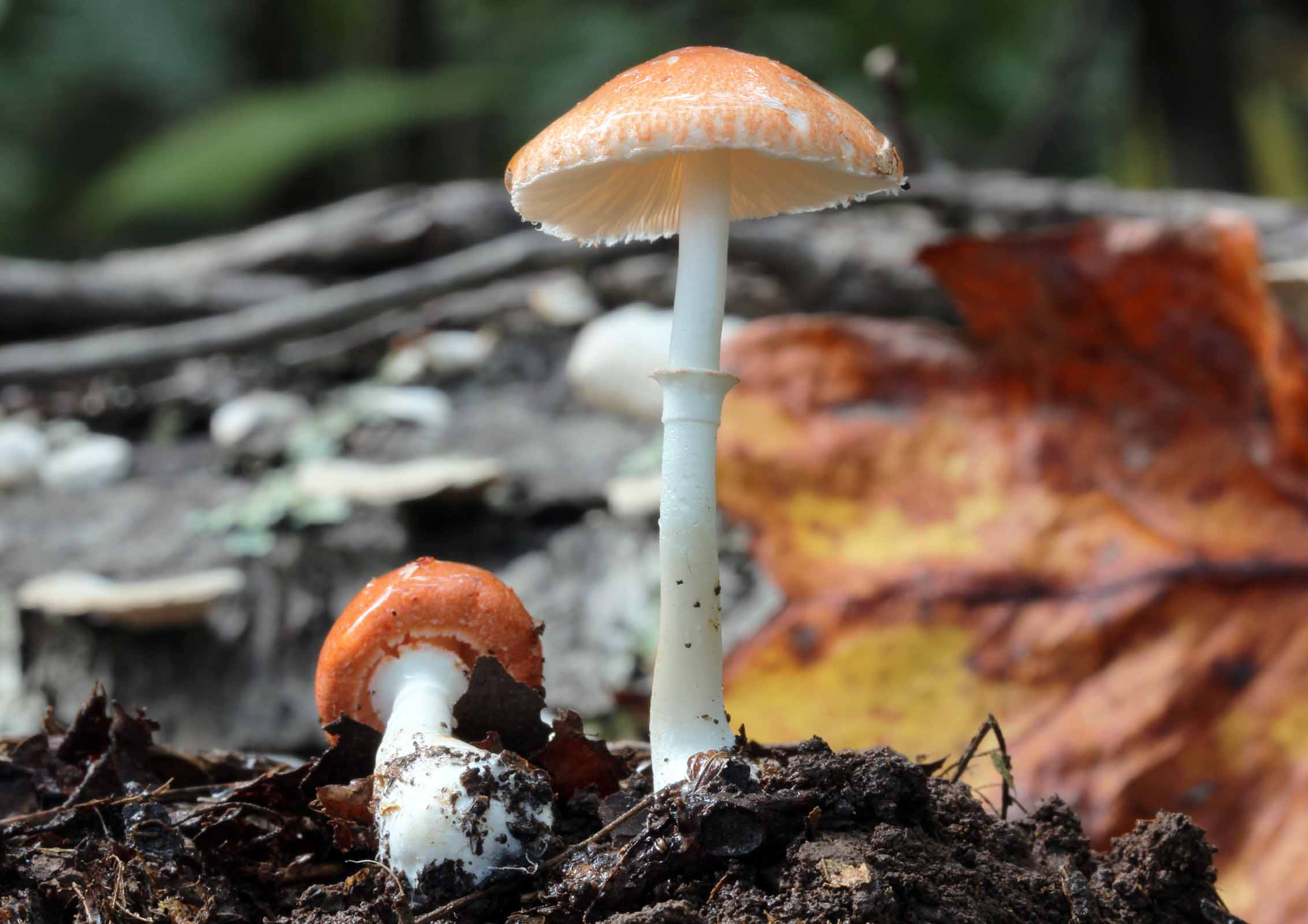

Scientific classification
- Kingdom: Fungi
- Division: Basidiomycota
- Class: Agaricomycetes
- Order: Agaricales
- Family: Agaricaceae
- Genus: Leucocoprinus
- Species: L. rubrotinctus

Binomial name
- Leucocoprinus rubrotinctus (Peck) Redhead (2023)

Synonyms
- Agaricus rubrotinctus Peck (1884); Lepiota rubrotincta Peck (1891); Leucoagaricus rubrotinctus Singer (1948)

= Leucocoprinus rubrotinctus =

Species of fungus

Leucocoprinus rubrotinctus, commonly known as the red-eyed parasol, is a widespread species of fungus in the family Agaricaceae.

== Taxonomy ==
It was described as new to science in 1884 by American mycologist Charles Horton Peck as Agaricus rubrotinctus. In 1948 it was reclassified as Leucoagaricus rubrotinctus by the German mycologist Rolf Singer and then in 2023 it was reclassified as Leucocoprinus rubrotinctus when the Leucocoprinus and Leucoagaricus genera began to be combined.

The fungus may be a complex of several closely related species.

== Description ==
The cap is up to 8 centimetres (3 1/4 in) wide, reddish brown, and convex to flat. The margin splits and causes lines of the whitish flesh to darken. The gills are white and do not stain. The stipe is up to 10 cm long, whitish and enlarged at the base, with a fragile ring. The species is found in leaf litter in much of North America and is inedible.
