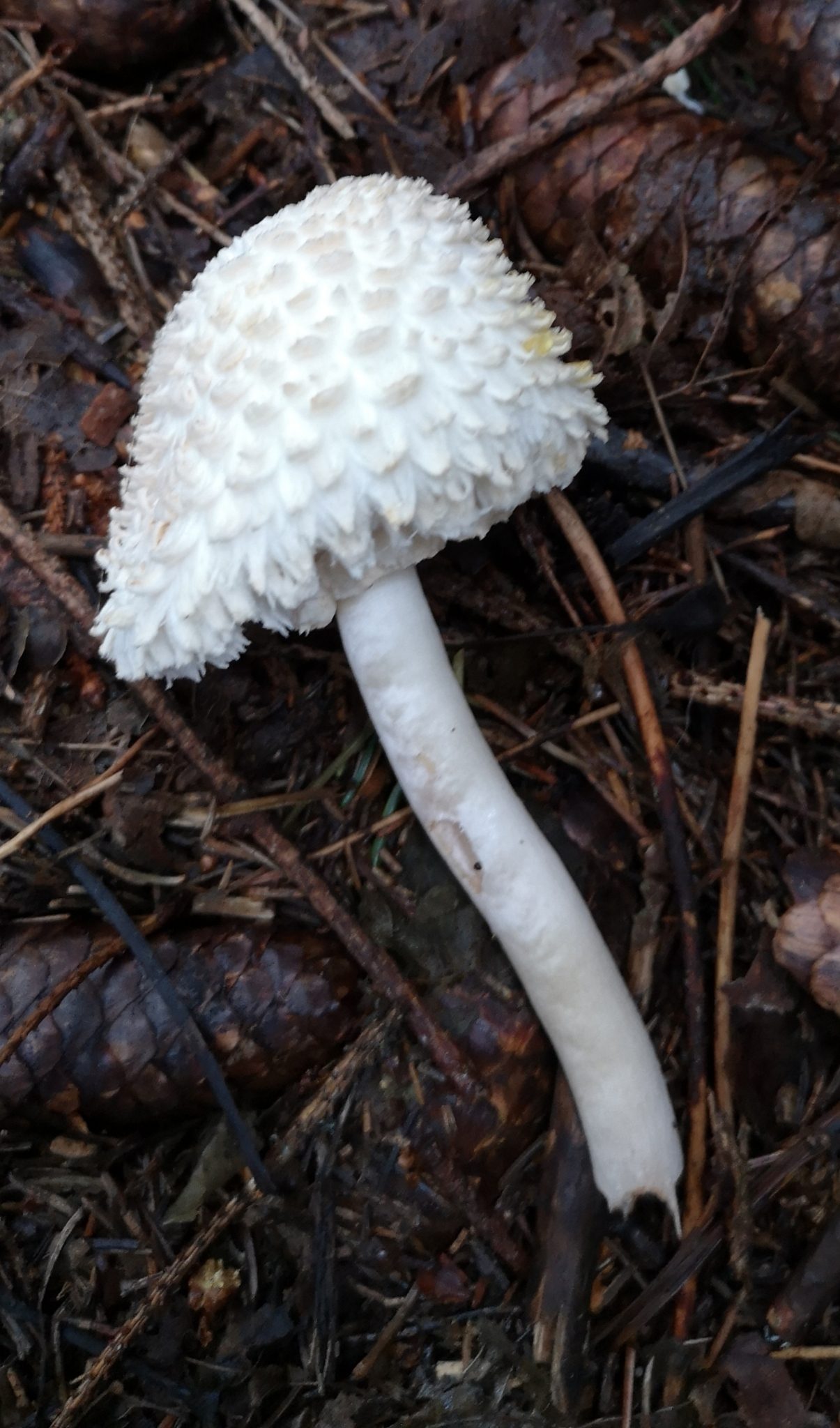

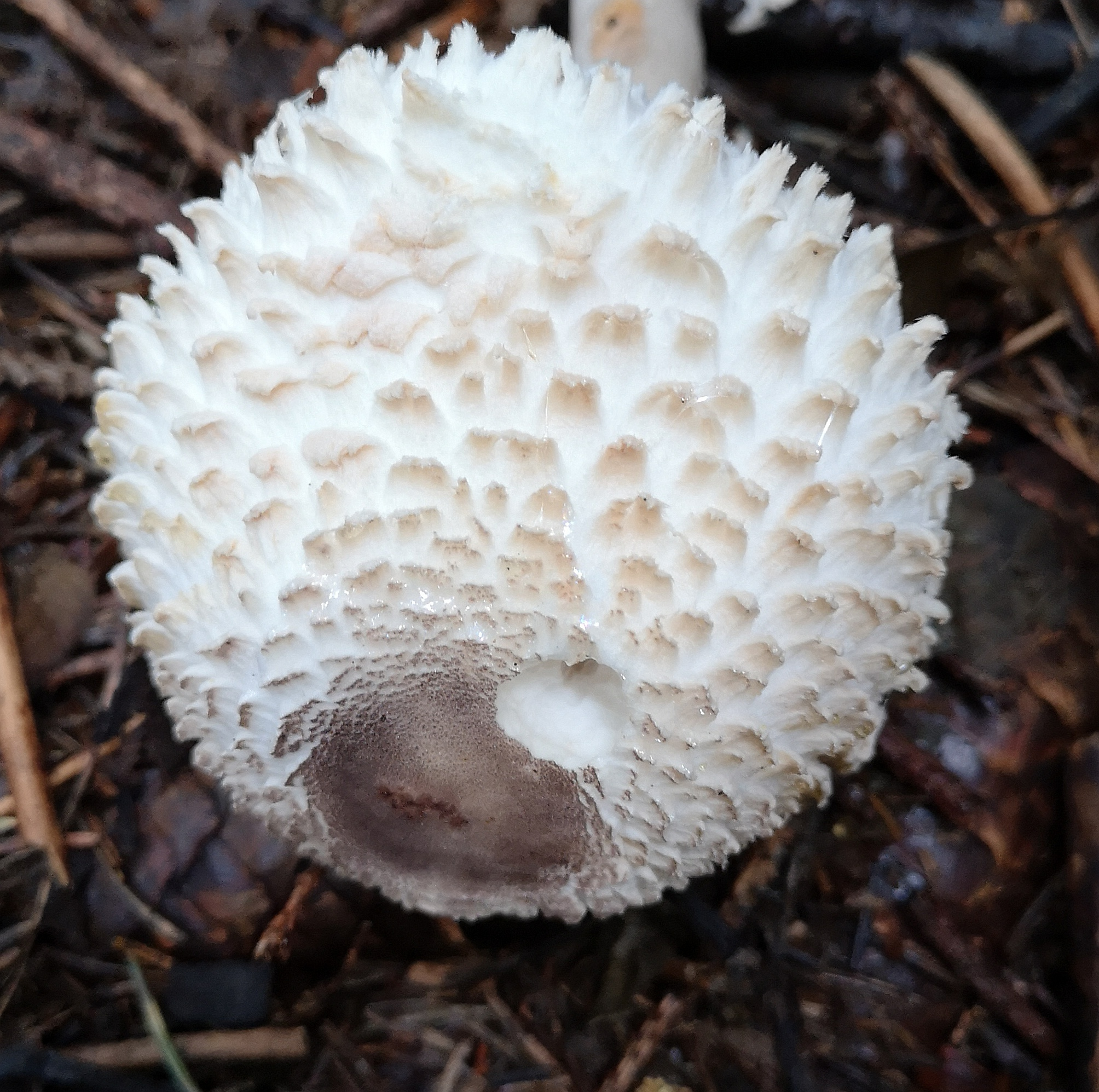

Scientific classification
- Kingdom: Fungi
- Division: Basidiomycota
- Class: Agaricomycetes
- Order: Agaricales
- Family: Agaricaceae
- Genus: Leucocoprinus
- Species: L. nympharum

Binomial name
- Leucocoprinus nympharum (Kalchbr.) M. Asif, Saba & Vellinga (2024)

Synonyms
- Agaricus nympharum Kalchbr. (1873); Lepiota nympharum Kalchbr. (1879); Mastocephalus nympharum Kuntze (1891); Macrolepiota nympharum Wasser (1985); Agaricus rhacodes var. puellaris Fr. (1863); Lepiota puellaris P. Karst. (1879); Lepiota rhacodes var. puellaris Sacc. (1887); Lepiota procera var. puellaris Massee (1893); Lepiota rhacodes subsp. puellaris Sacc. (1897); Lepiotophyllum rhacodes var. puellaris Locq. (1942); Leucocoprinus puellaris Locq. (1945); Macrolepiota puellaris M.M. Moser (1967); Leucoagaricus nympharum Bon (1977)

= Leucocoprinus nympharum =

Species of fungus

Leucocoprinus nympharum
- Mycological characteristics
- Gills on hymenium
- Cap is convex or flat
- Hymenium is free
- Stipe has a ring
- Spore print is white
- Ecology is saprotrophic
- Edibility is unknown

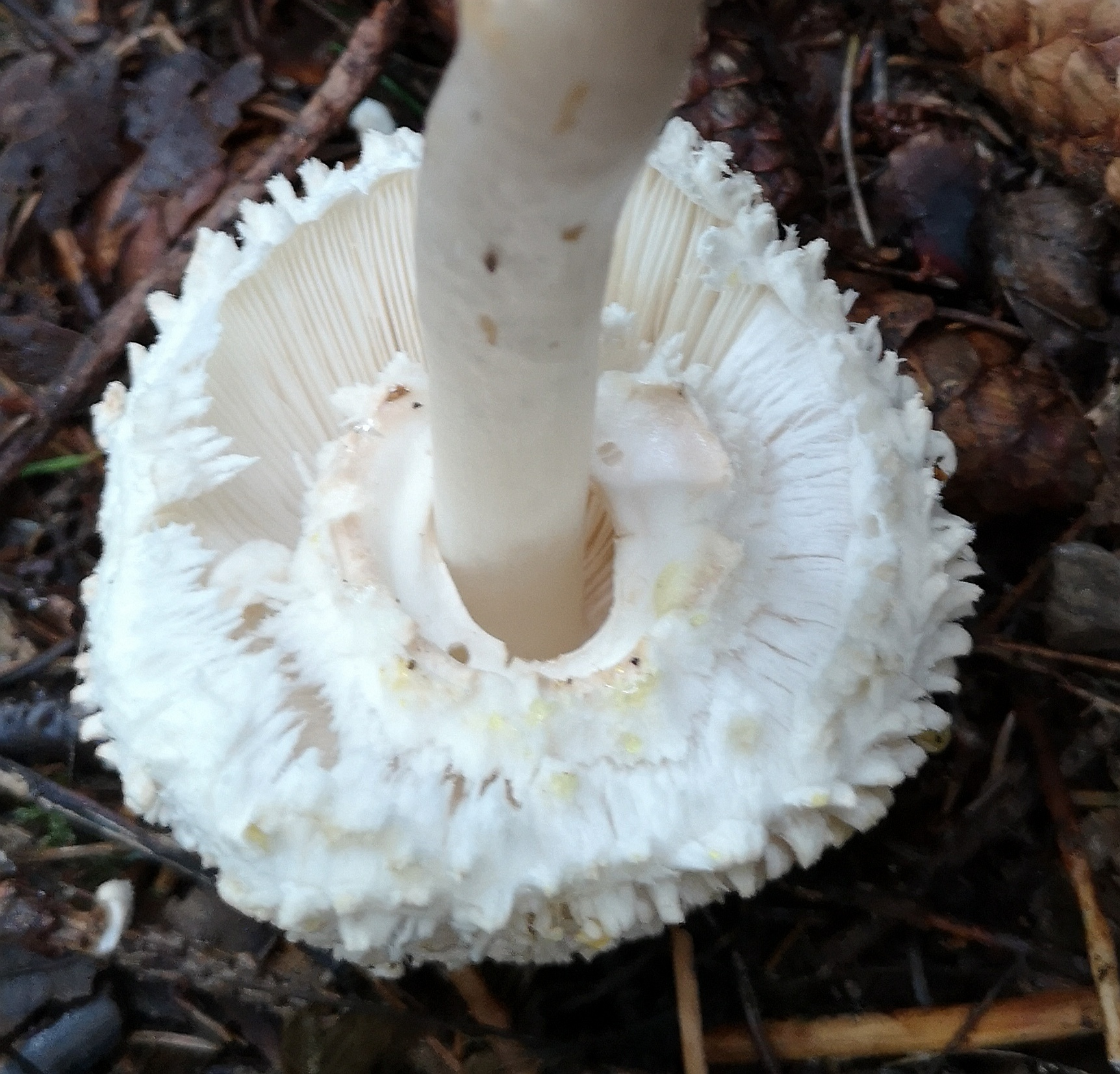
Gill details

Leucocoprinus nympharum is a species of fungus in the family Agaricaceae.

== Taxonomy ==
Originally classified as Agaricus nympharum by the Hungarian mycologist Károly Kalchbrenner in 1873 and reclassified as Leucoagaricus nympharum by the French mycologist Marcel Bon in 1977.

It was reclassified as Leucocoprinus nympharum in 2024.

== Description ==
Leucocoprinus nympharum is a large white dapperling mushroom with a distinctive scaly cap which resembles that of Chlorophyllum rhacodes only with a smaller, 4-10cm cap and a more starkly white colour. Despite its distinctive appearance it is seldom recorded and little known.
