= Leucocoprinus gaillardii =

Scientific classification
- Kingdom: Fungi
- Division: Basidiomycota
- Class: Agaricomycetes
- Order: Agaricales
- Family: Agaricaceae
- Genus: Leucocoprinus
- Species: L. gaillardii

Binomial name
- Leucocoprinus gaillardii (Bon & Boiffard) M. Asif, Saba & Vellinga (2024)

Synonyms
- Leucoagaricus gaillardii Bon & Boiffard (1974)

Species of fungus

Leucoagaricus gaillardii is a species of fungus belonging to the family Agaricaceae. It is native to Northern Europe.

== Taxonomy ==
It was described as Leucoagaricus gaillardii in 1974 by the French mycologists Marcel Bon and Jacques Boiffard and then reclassified as Leucocoprinus gaillardii in 2024.
