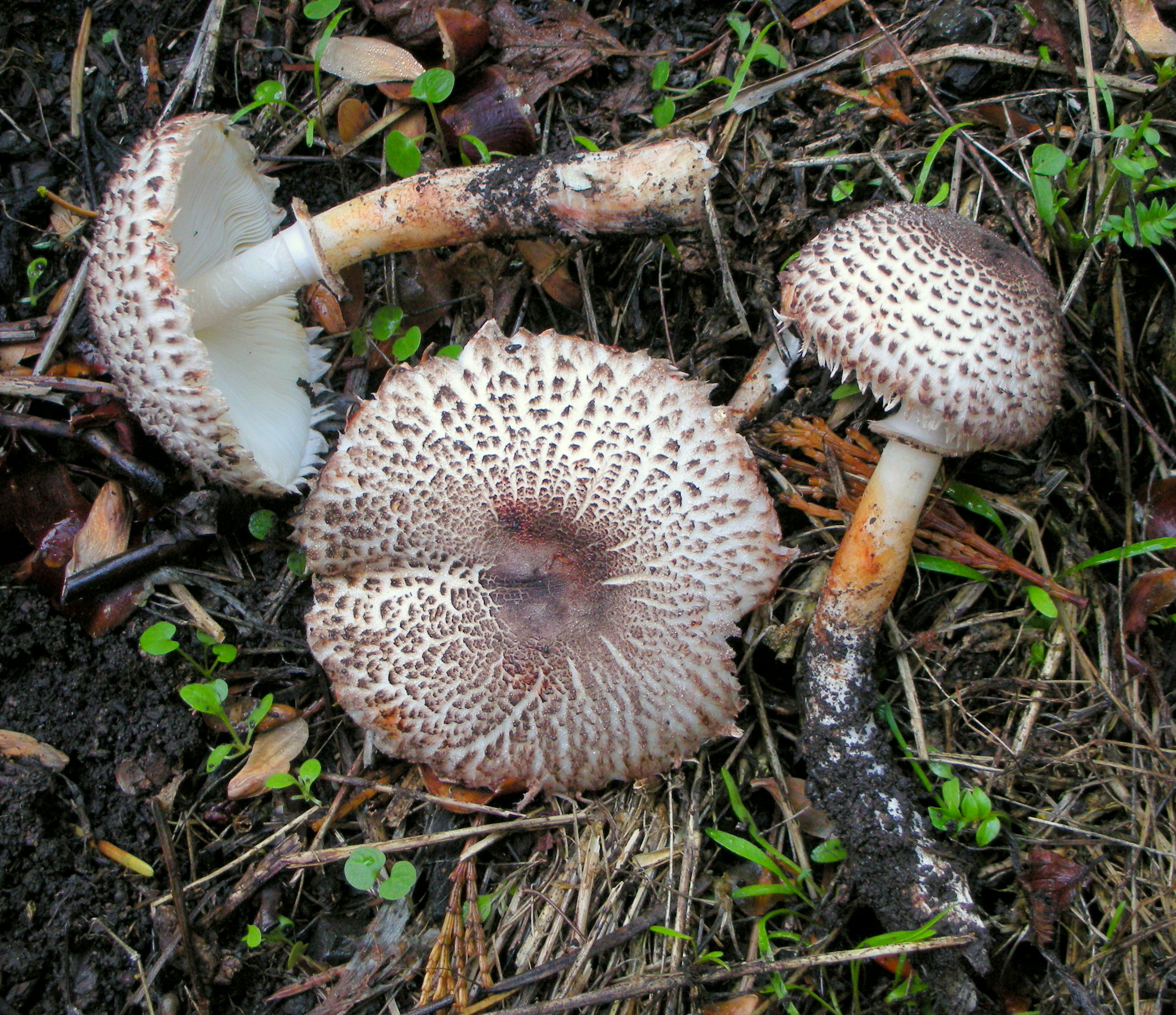

Scientific classification
- Kingdom: Fungi
- Division: Basidiomycota
- Class: Agaricomycetes
- Order: Agaricales
- Family: Agaricaceae
- Genus: Leucocoprinus
- Species: L. erythrophaeus

Binomial name
- Leucocoprinus erythrophaeus (Vellinga) Redhead (2023)

Synonyms
- Leucoagaricus erythrophaeus Vellinga (2010)

= Leucocoprinus erythrophaeus =

Species of fungus

Leucocoprinus erythrophaeus
- Mycological characteristics
- Gills on hymenium
- Cap is convex or flat
- Hymenium is free
- Stipe has a ring
- Spore print is white
- Edibility is unknown

Leucocoprinus erythrophaeus is a species of agaric fungus. Described as new to science in 2010, it is found in California, where it grows in mixed forest. The specific epithet erythrophaeus originates from the Greek words ερυ𝛉ρος ("red" or "bloody") and Φαιος ("dark"), and refers to the mushroom's characteristic bruising reaction. The species was formerly known under the misapplied name Lepiota roseifolia.

== Taxonomy ==
It was described as Leucoagaricus erythrophaeus in 2010 by the mycologists Else Vellinga, Contu Marco and Alfredo Vizzini.

In 2023 this species was reclassified as Leucocoprinus erythrophaeus.

== Description ==
Its cap is 18-60 mm across. Its shape is initially hemispherical, then expanding to be convex or conical, ending up flat, or even slightly concave. It has dark brown scales arranged circularly around the purple to red to brown centre. When touched, the cap turns red-orange, which fades to dark-brown.

The gills are free from the stipe, and often attached to a collar-like structure called a collarium. They are moderately crowded, and yellowish white, turning orange when touched.

The stipe measures 55–70 x 4–5 mm, and is cylindrical near the top, though it widens at the base, up to 15 mm wide. It is hollow and hairy, and has pale yellow to cream-coloured flesh. It has a white annulus with fringed edges that flares upwards or downwards. The flesh of Leucocoprinus erythrophaeus is white, though orange when cut. It has a white spore print.

The odour ranges from indistinct to astringent.

=== Microscopic features ===
The basidiospores measure 5.9–8.8 x 3.5–4.9 μm, are ellipsoid and have relatively thick walls. They do not have any germ pores. They turn reddish-brown when mounted with iodine-based reagent (are dextrinoid) and they stain readily by Congo red. They are metachromatic in Cresyl blue. The basidia measure 15–29 x 6.5–9.0 μm, and have 4 sterigmata each. Pleurocystidia are absent. The cheilocystidia measure 30–93 x 8–14 μm, and are narrowly club-shaped to cylindrical, and sometimes have a forked apex. They are brown and have dark granules when in ammonia.

Clamp connections are absent in all tissues.

== Habitat and Distribution ==
Leucocoprinus erythrophaeus has been found north of Mendocino county in California, for example in Picea sitchensis and Tsuga heterophylla forests or Alnus rubra and Sequoia sempervirens forests in the north, and in Pseudotsuga menziesii and Sequoia sempervirens forests in central coastal California. It grows from late October through early December in small groups. The true distribution is unknown.

== Similar species ==
Leucoagaricus badhamii exhibits similar red staining. Leucocoprinus erythrophaeus differs from L. flammeotincta, by its pseudocollarium, orange staining gills and trichodermal elements on cap.

- List of Leucoagaricus species
