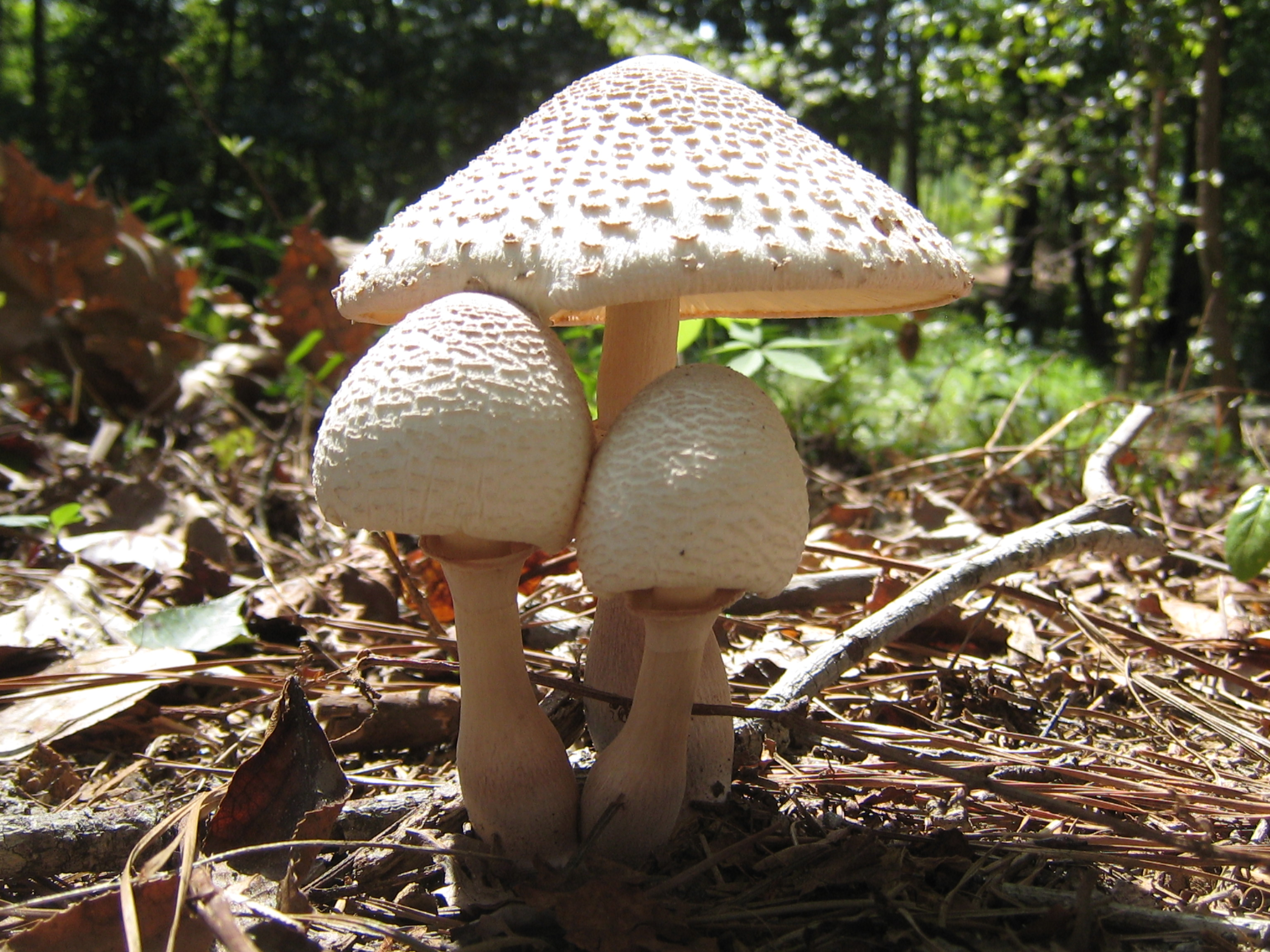
- The type species Macropsalliota americana

Scientific classification
- Kingdom: Fungi
- Division: Basidiomycota
- Class: Agaricomycetes
- Order: Agaricales
- Family: Agaricaceae
- Genus: Macropsalliota; Kun L. Yang, Jia Y. Lin & Zhu L. Yang (2024)

Type species
- Macropsalliota americana (Peck) Kun L. Yang, Jia Y. Lin & Zhu L. Yang 2024

= Macropsalliota =

Genus of fungi

Macropsalliota is a genus of mushroom-forming fungi in the family Agaricaceae.

== Taxonomy ==
This genus was created in 2024 by the Chinese mycologists Kun L. Yang, Jia Y. Lin & Zhu L. Yang who reclassified eight Leucoagaricus species as Macropsalliota.

== Species ==
Species include:

- Macropsalliota americana
- Macropsalliota dextrinoidespora
- Macropsalliota holospilota
- Macropsalliota majuscula
- Macropsalliota meleagris
- Macropsalliota mucrocystis
- Macropsalliota purpureorubra
- Macropsalliota subtropica
- Macropsalliota tropica
