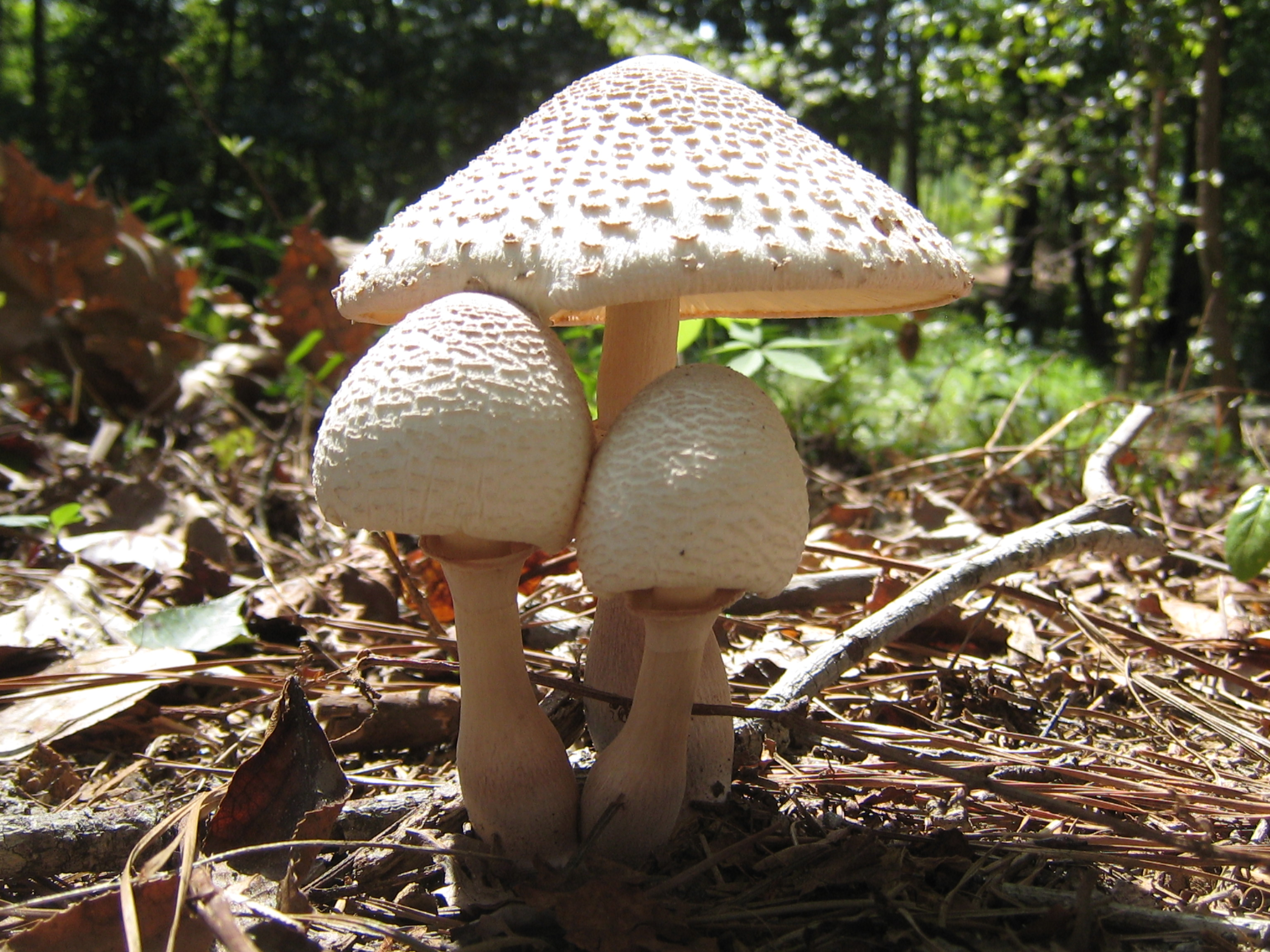

Scientific classification
- Kingdom: Fungi
- Division: Basidiomycota
- Class: Agaricomycetes
- Order: Agaricales
- Family: Agaricaceae
- Genus: Macropsalliota
- Species: M. americana

Binomial name
- Macropsalliota americana (Peck) Kun L. Yang, Jia Y. Lin & Zhu L. Yang (2024)

Synonyms
- Agaricus americanus (Peck); Lepiota americana (Peck) Sacc.; Lepiota bresadolae Schulzer; Agaricus americanus Peck (1869); Leucocoprinus americanus (Peck) Redhead (1979); Leucocoprinus biornatus sensu auct. brit., auct. eur. (2005); Leucoagaricus americanus (Peck) Vellinga (2000)

= Macropsalliota americana =

Species of fungus

Macropsalliota americana
- Mycological characteristics
- Gills on hymenium
- Cap is flat or convex
- Hymenium is free
- Stipe has a ring
- Spore print is white
- Ecology is saprotrophic
- Edibility is not recommended

Macropsalliota americana, commonly known as the American parasol, is the type species of the fungus genus Macropsalliota. It was formerly known as Leucoagaricus americanus. It is widely distributed in North America, mostly east of the Rocky Mountains. It is saprobic and grows on sawdust, wood chips, stumps, and the ground.

== Taxonomy ==
The species was first described as Agaricus americanus by the American mycologist Charles Horton Peck in 1872 and then reclassified as Lepiota americana in 1887 by the Italian mycologist Pier Andrea Saccardo.

In 1979 it was reclassified as a Leucocoprinus americanus by the Canadian mycologist Scott A. Redhead and then as Leucoagaricus americanus by the mycologist Else Vellinga in 2000.

In 2024 the species was reclassified as Macropsalliota americana by the Chinese mycologists Kun L. Yang, Jia Y. Lin & Zhu L. Yang and became the type species of the newly created Macropsalliota genus.

== Description ==
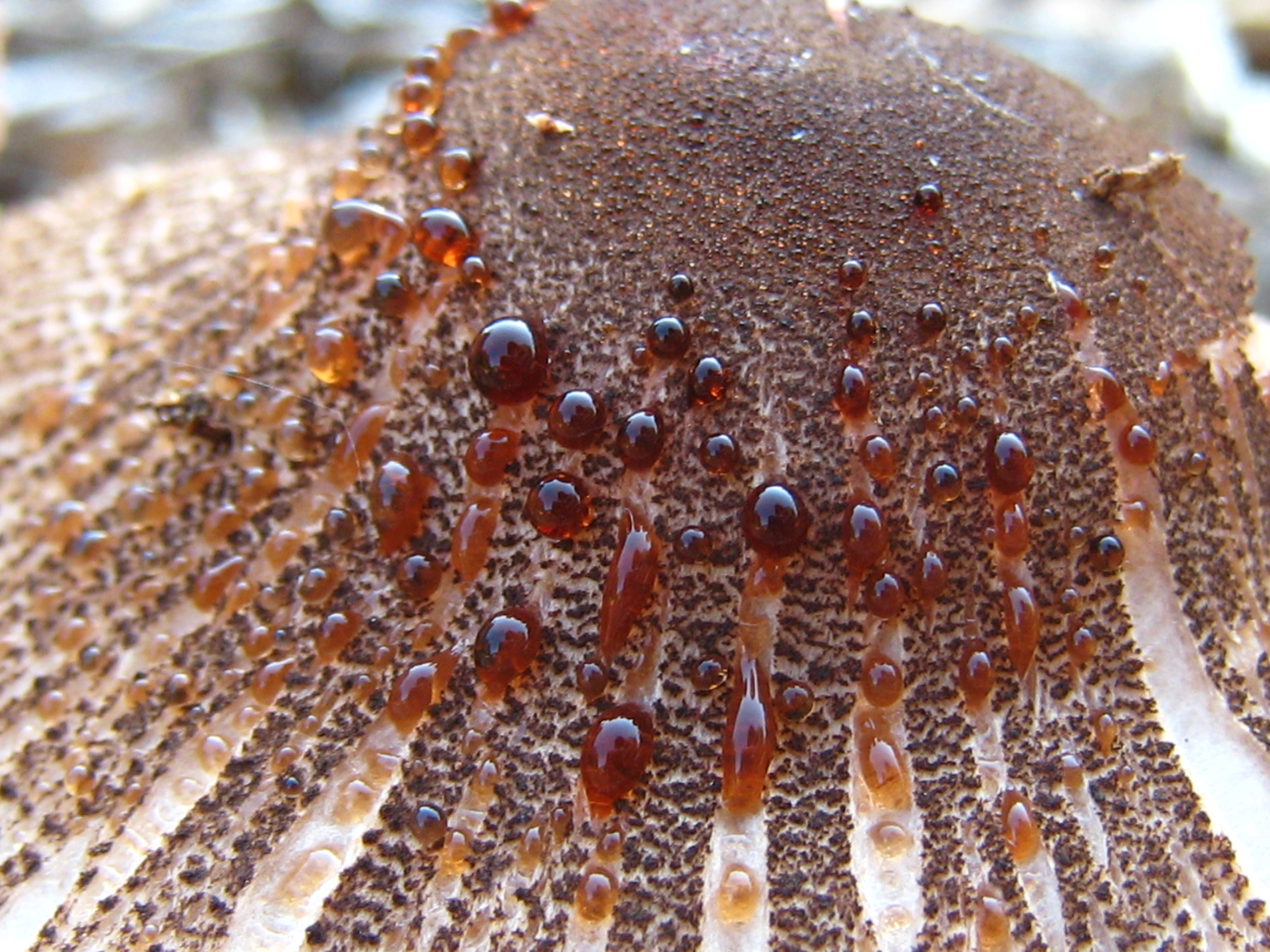
Leucoagaricus americanus

The cap is oval in shape when immature, becoming convex to flat when fully grown, reaching up to 3–15 centimetres (1 1/4–6 in) wide. The cap feels dry and smooth at the beginning, but gradually gets reddish to reddish brown scales. It is white in color but reddens with maturity or after being handled. The gills are free from the stipe and lie close together. They appear white when young and are stained pinkish to maroon. The stipe is 7–14 cm long, often enlarged at or below the middle and tapering toward the base. It appears white at first, staining or aging pink or reddish brown. It feels smooth with its silky hairs. The membranous veil leaves a white double edged ring on the upper stipe that may disappear in age.

The spores are white to cream in color and measure 8–10 x 6–7.5 μm. The flesh is white throughout. It bruises yellow to orange when cut and develops red colouration when old or when dried. The flesh is thick and discolors when cut, bruised or damaged.

It is reported to be edible, but not recommended for consumption because of possible confusion with toxic species like Chlorophyllum molybdites.

== Distribution and habitat ==
It is widely distributed in its native North America, though more common east of the Rocky Mountains; it is saprobic, and grows on sawdust, on wood chips, on stumps, and on the ground.

== Edibility ==
The species is regarded as edible though it is generally not recommended for inexperienced foragers due to the potential to confuse it with dangerously toxic species.

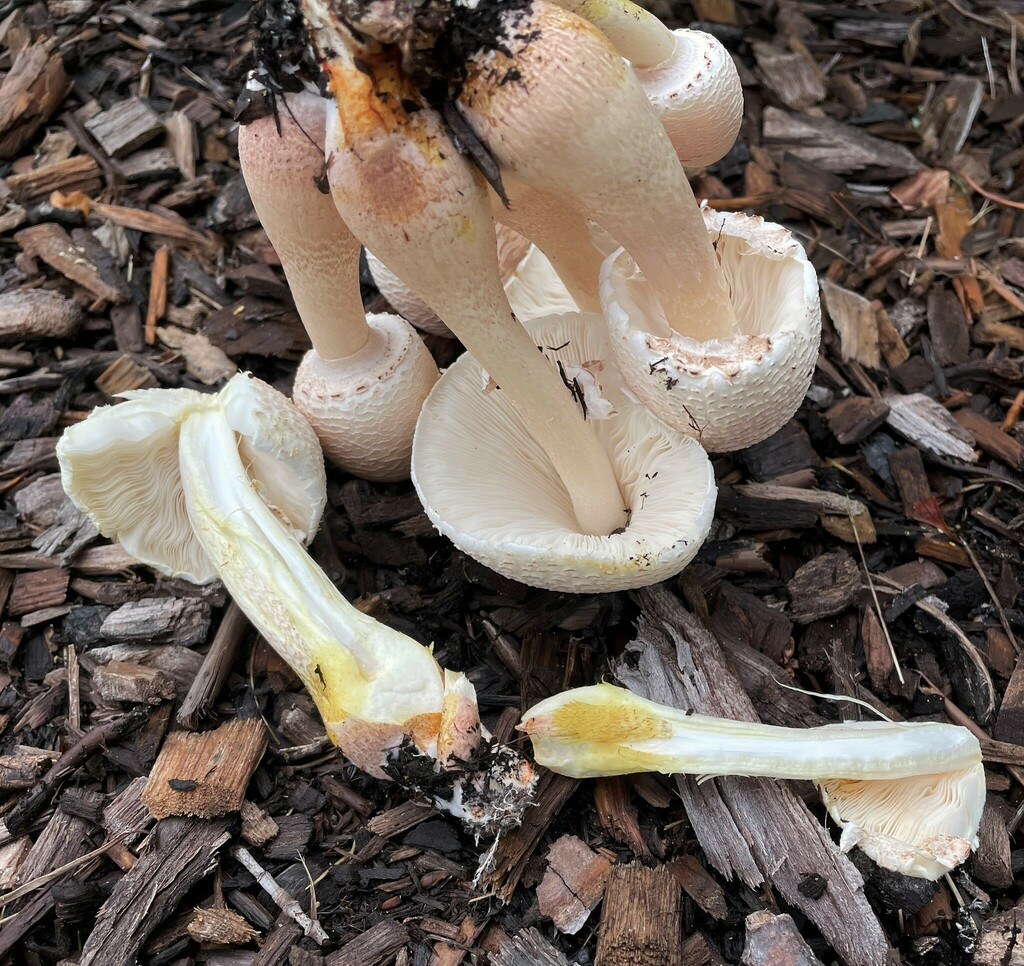
Yellow bruising

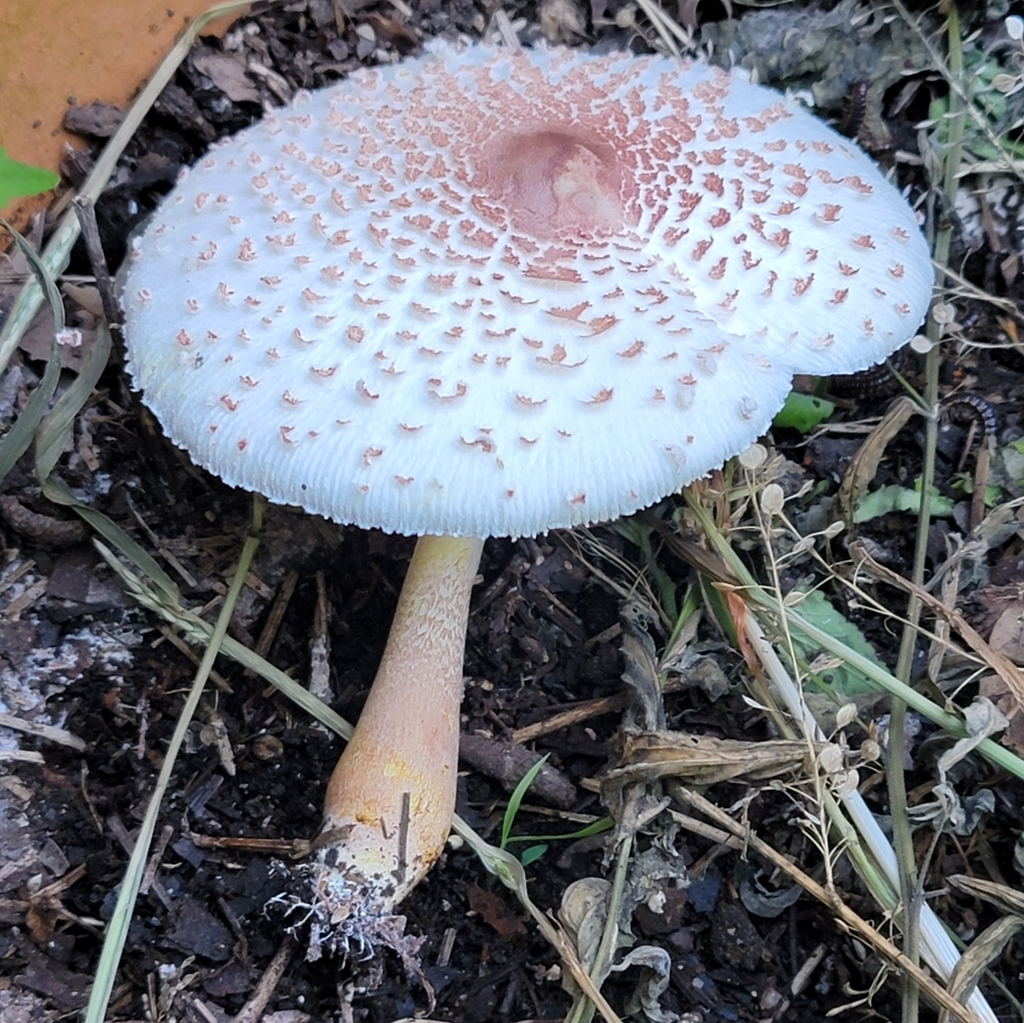
Reddening
