= Marcel Locquin =

French mycologist

Marcel Locquin (born 6 May 1922 in Lyon, France; died 18 March 2009) was a French mycologist.

Locquin rose to eminence in the field of mycology over several years of work with a number of Nobel Prize winners. He himself won numerous awards. He worked as consultant for many international organizations. He filed many patents in light and electron microscopy.

== Authorship ==
Locquin was a prolific writer. He authored 60 books. He published well over 350 articles, which dealt mostly on areas like biophysical techniques, biomathematics, cytochemistry, light and electron microscopy, mycology, taxonomy, smells, colors, origin of languages, transdisciplinary methods, computers and artificial intelligence, and sociology.

== See also ==
- Category:Taxa named by Marcel Locquin
