= List of Leucoagaricus species =

This is a list of species in the agaric genus Leucoagaricus.

== Species ==
As of March 2023, Species Fungorum accepted 205 species of Leucoagaricus.

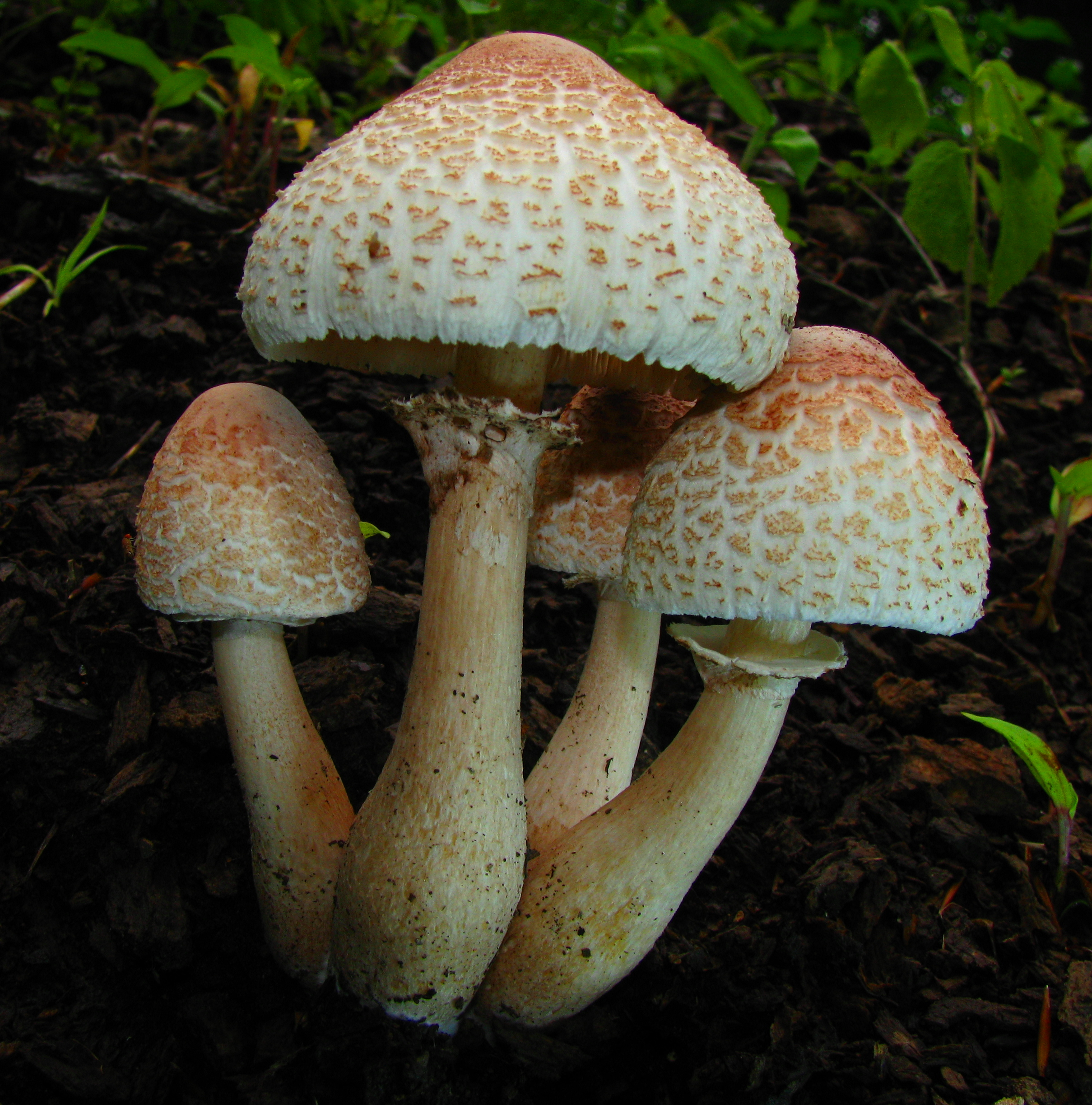
Leucoagaricus americanus

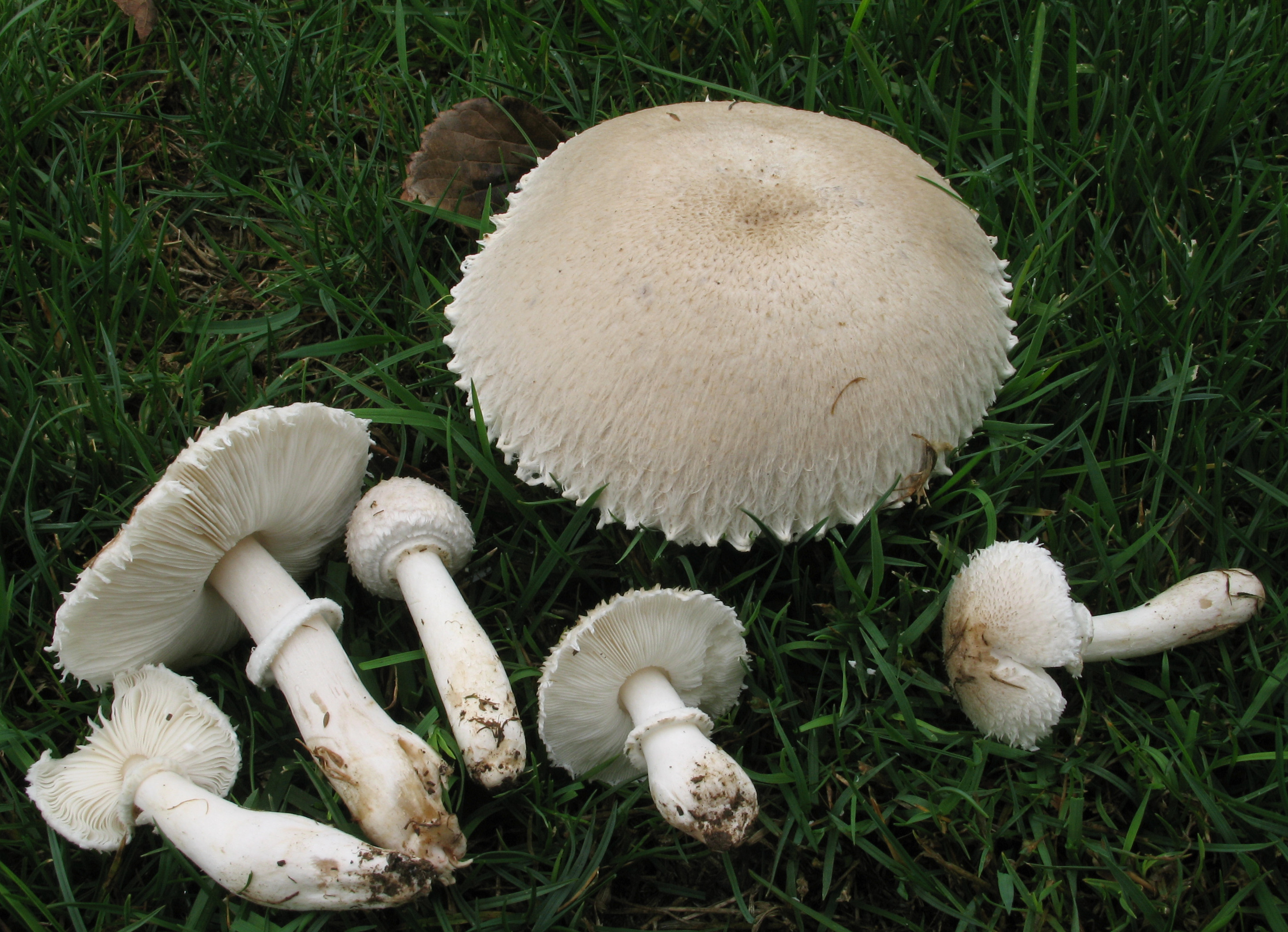
Leucoagaricus barssii

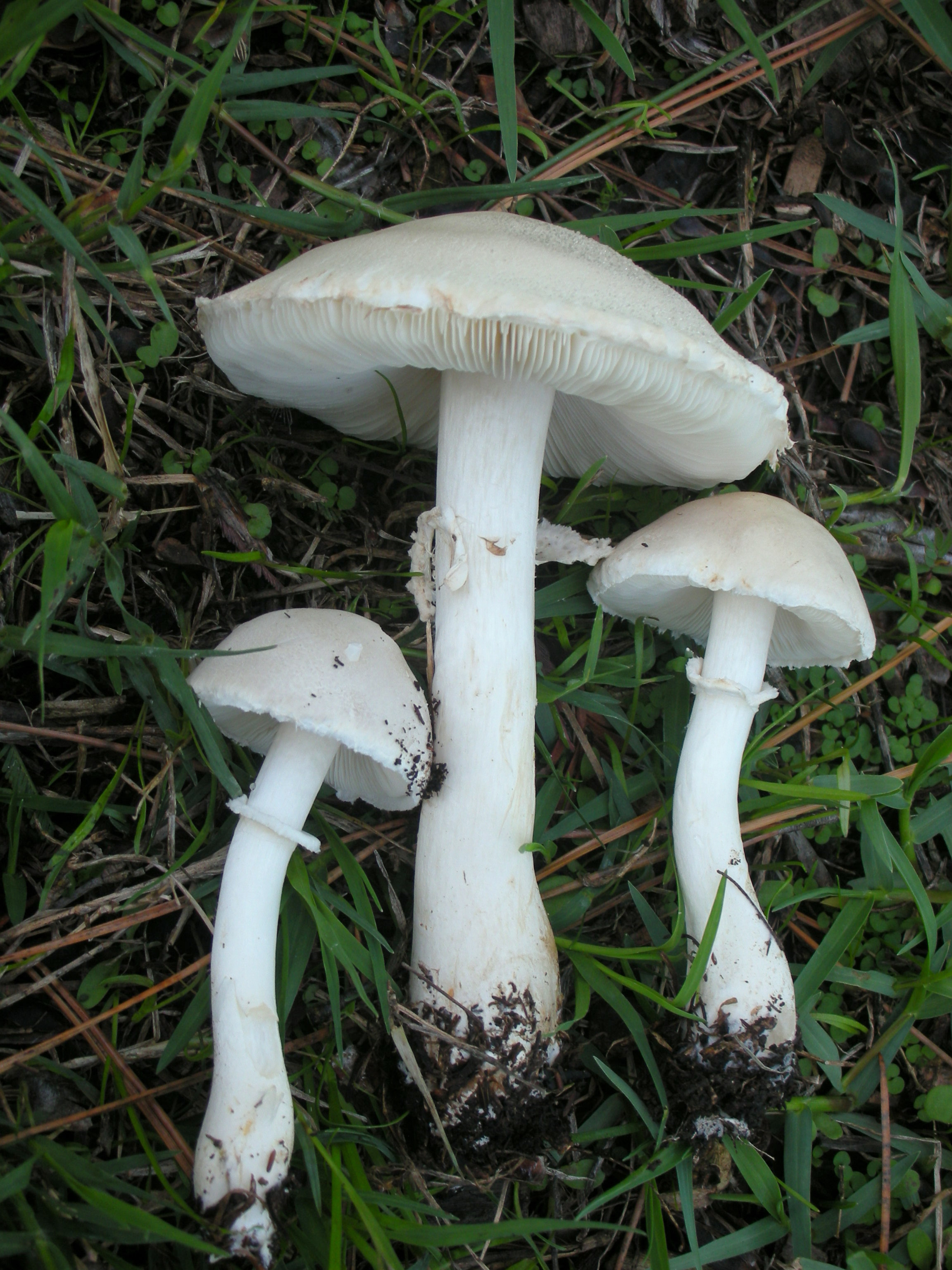
Leucoagaricus leucothites

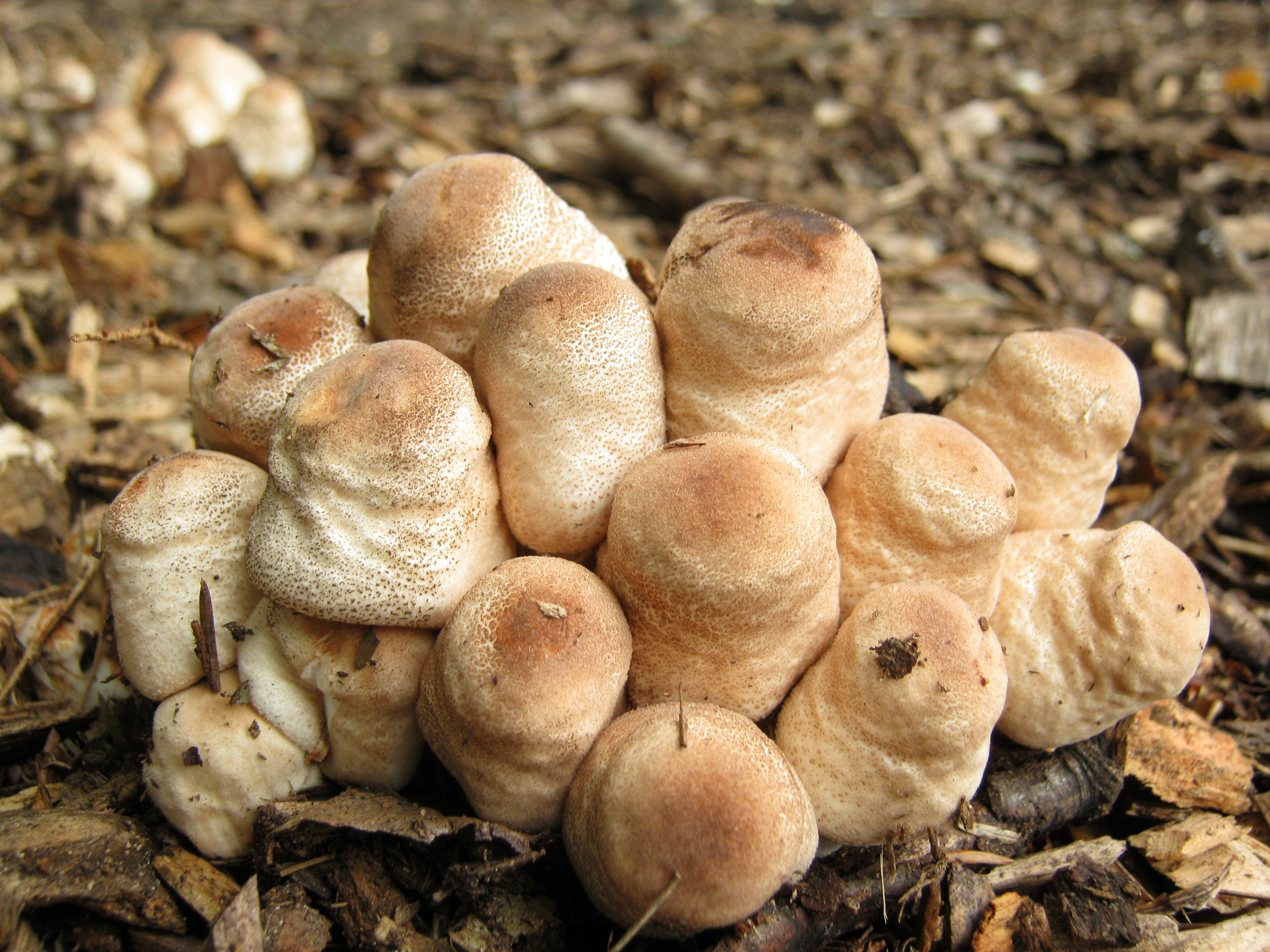
Leucoagaricus meleagris

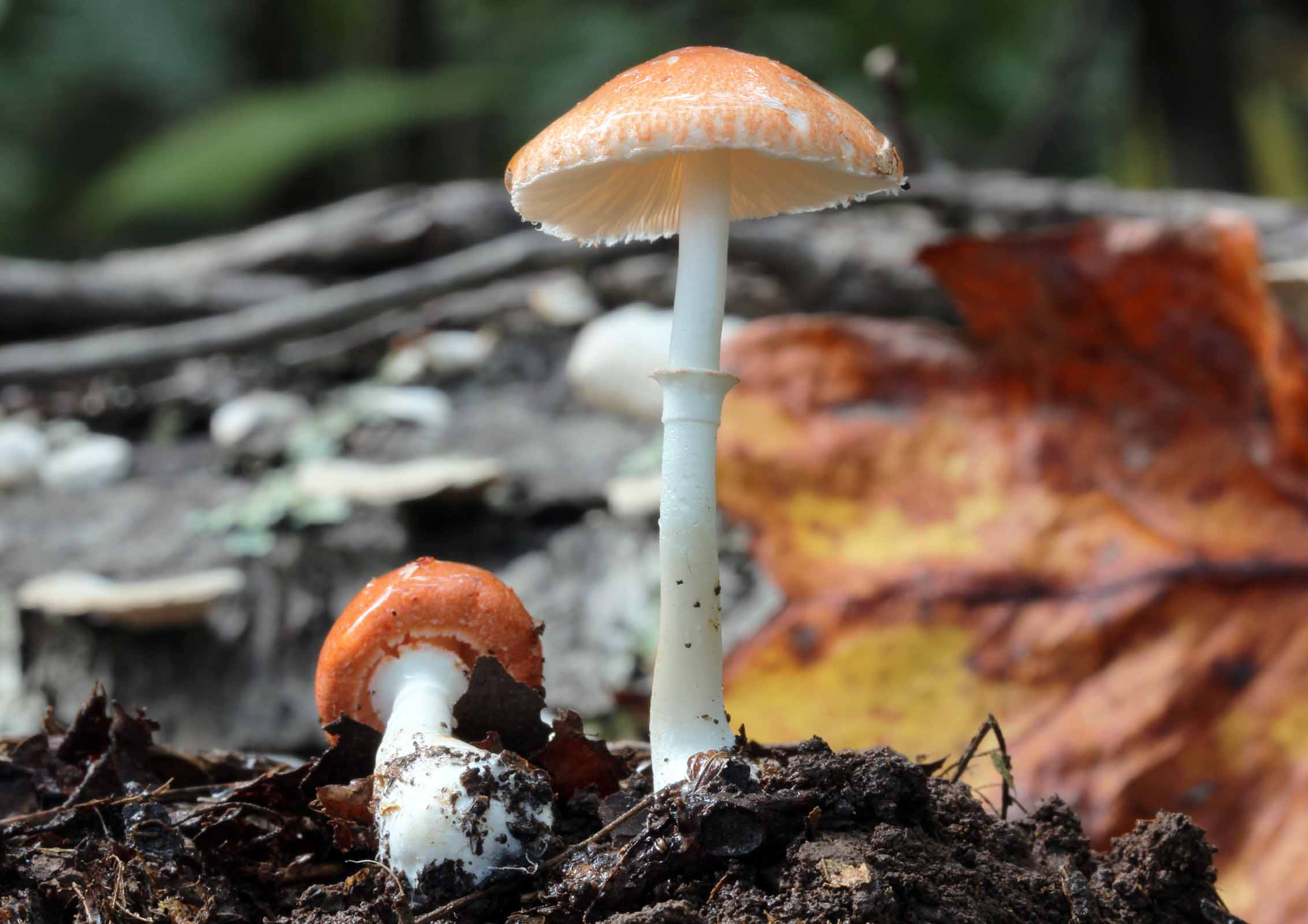
Leucoagaricus rubrotinctus

1. Leucoagaricus acaciarum Singer (1973)
2. Leucoagaricus adelphicus Vellinga (2010)
3. Leucoagaricus agaricaceus Heinem. (1973)
4. Leucoagaricus albidus B. Kumari & Atri (2013)
5. Leucoagaricus amanitoides R.M. Davis & Vellinga (2006)
6. Leucoagaricus amazonicus A. Ortiz & Franco-Mol. (2009)
7. Leucoagaricus americanus (Peck) Vellinga (2000)
8. Leucoagaricus ammovirescens (Bon) Migl. & Coppola (2022)
9. Leucoagaricus amylosporus (Malençon) Bon (1981)
10. Leucoagaricus ariminensis Dovana, Angeli, Contu & Brandi (2017)
11. Leucoagaricus asiaticus Qasim, Nawaz & Khalid (2015)
12. Leucoagaricus atroalbus P. Mohr & Dähncke (2004)
13. Leucoagaricus atroazureus J.F. Liang, Zhu L. Yang & J. Xu (2010)
14. Leucoagaricus atrofibrillosus Singer (1969)
15. Leucoagaricus atrosquamulosus (Hongo) Z.W. Ge & Zhu L. Yang (2017)
16. Leucoagaricus aurantiacus Heinem. (1973)
17. Leucoagaricus aurantiovergens A. Gennari & Migl. (1999)
18. Leucoagaricus babosiae Bon (1993)
19. Leucoagaricus badhamii (Berk. & Broome) Singer (1951)
20. Leucoagaricus badius S. Hussain, Pfister, Afshan & Khalid (2018)
21. Leucoagaricus barssii (Zeller) Vellinga (2000)
22. Leucoagaricus bingensis (Beeli) Heinem. (1973)
23. Leucoagaricus bisporus Heinem. (1973)
24. Leucoagaricus bivelatus B.P. Akers & Ovrebo (2005)
25. Leucoagaricus bohusii (Wasser) Bon (1981)
26. Leucoagaricus bonii A. Caball. (1997)
27. Leucoagaricus boudierianus Bon (1993)
28. Leucoagaricus brunneocanus Fei Yu, J.F. Liang & Z.W. Ge (2016)
29. Leucoagaricus brunneocingulatus (P.D. Orton) Bon (1976)
30. Leucoagaricus brunneodiscus A.K. Dutta & K. Acharya (2021)
31. Leucoagaricus brunneolilacinus Babos (1980)
32. Leucoagaricus brunneosquamulosus P. Mohr & Dähncke (2004)
33. Leucoagaricus brunneus Z. Ullah, Jabeen & Khalid (2020)
34. Leucoagaricus bulbiger Justo, Bizzi & Angelini (2021)
35. Leucoagaricus bulbillosus Heinem. (1973)
36. Leucoagaricus caeruleovertens Justo, Bizzi & Angelini (2021)
37. Leucoagaricus callainitinctus K.P.D. Latha, K.N.A. Raj & Manim. (2020)
38. Leucoagaricus candicans T.K.A. Kumar & Manim. (2009)
39. Leucoagaricus carminescens Heinem. (1973)
40. Leucoagaricus carneifolius (Gillet) Wasser (1977)
41. Leucoagaricus chilensis (Speg.) E.F. Ruiz & Molinari-Novoa (2016)
42. Leucoagaricus cinerascens (Quél.) Bon & Boiffard (1978)
43. Leucoagaricus cinereolilacinus (Barbier) Bon & Boiffard (1978)
44. Leucoagaricus cinereopallidus (Contu) Consiglio & Contu (2004)
45. Leucoagaricus cinereoradicatus Boisselet & Migl. (2002)
46. Leucoagaricus clavipes Gubitz & Contu (2012)
47. Leucoagaricus coerulescens (Peck) J.F. Liang, Zhu L. Yang & J. Xu (2010)
48. Leucoagaricus confusus (Rick) Singer (1951)
49. Leucoagaricus croceobasis G. Muñoz, A. Caball., Contu & Vizzini (2014)
50. Leucoagaricus croceovelutinus (Bon & Boiffard) Bon (1976)
51. Leucoagaricus croceus S.M. Tang & K.D. Hyde (2022)
52. Leucoagaricus crystallifer Vellinga (2000)
53. Leucoagaricus crystalliferoides T.K.A. Kumar & Manim. (2009)
54. Leucoagaricus cupresseus (Burl.) Boisselet & Guinb. (2001)
55. Leucoagaricus cuprobrunneus (Raithelh.) Raithelh. (1989)
56. Leucoagaricus cyanescens Corriol & Chalange (2020)
57. Leucoagaricus cygneoaffinis (Pilát) P. Roux & Eyssart. (2011)
58. Leucoagaricus dacrytus Vellinga (2010)
59. Leucoagaricus deceptivus (Grilli) Consiglio & Contu (2004)
60. Leucoagaricus decipiens Contu, Vizzini & Vellinga (2010)
61. Leucoagaricus denticulatus (Speg.) E. Horak (1967)
62. Leucoagaricus dialeri (Bres. & Torrend) D.A. Reid (1975)
63. Leucoagaricus dyscritus Vellinga (2010)
64. Leucoagaricus eriodermus (Malençon) Bon (1981)
65. Leucoagaricus erminiae Consiglio, Setti & Vizzini (2021)
66. Leucoagaricus erubescens (Babos) Bon (1993)
67. Leucoagaricus erythrellus (Speg.) Singer (1969)
68. Leucoagaricus erythrophaeus Vellinga (2010)
69. Leucoagaricus exannulatus Singer (1973)
70. Leucoagaricus ferruginosus Heinem. (1973)
71. Leucoagaricus fimetarius (Sacc.) Aberdeen (1992)
72. Leucoagaricus flammeotinctoides Vellinga (2010)
73. Leucoagaricus flavovirens J.F. Liang, Zhu L. Yang & J. Xu (2010)
74. Leucoagaricus flavus Sysouph. & Thongkl. (2022)
75. Leucoagaricus fragilis M. Asif, Niazi, A. Izhar & Khalid (2021)
76. Leucoagaricus fulgineodiffractus Bellù & Lanzoni (1988)
77. Leucoagaricus fuligineodiscus P. Mohr & E. Ludw. (2004)
78. Leucoagaricus fuligineus Pegler (1977)
79. Leucoagaricus gaillardii Bon & Boiffard (1974)
80. Leucoagaricus gauguei Bon & Boiffard (1974)
81. Leucoagaricus georginae (W.G. Sm.) Candusso (1990)
82. Leucoagaricus globisporus (Raithelh.) Raithelh. (2004)
83. Leucoagaricus gongylophorus (Möller) Singer (1986)
84. Leucoagaricus goossensiae (Beeli) Heinem. (1973)
85. Leucoagaricus griseosquamosus Sysouph. & Thongkl. (2022)
86. Leucoagaricus griseus Heinem. (1979)
87. Leucoagaricus guatopoensis (Dennis) Justo, Bizzi & Angelini (2021)
88. Leucoagaricus gujratensis A. Rehman, Usman, Afshan & Khalid, Phytotaxa 589(1): 43 (2023)
89. Leucoagaricus hesperius Vellinga (2010)
90. Leucoagaricus houaynhangensis Sysouphanthong (2018)
91. Leucoagaricus ianthinophaeus Locq. (1952)
92. Leucoagaricus ianthinosquamulosus Guinb. (1993)
93. Leucoagaricus idae fragum Guinb., Boisselet & G. Dupuy (1998)
94. Leucoagaricus imperialis (Speg.) Pegler (1997)
95. Leucoagaricus infuscatus Vellinga (2007)
96. Leucoagaricus ionidicolor Bellù & Lanzoni (1988)
97. Leucoagaricus irinellus Chalange (1999)
98. Leucoagaricus japonicus (Kawam. ex Hongo) Hongo (1986)
99. Leucoagaricus jubilaei (Joss.) Bon (1983)
100. Leucoagaricus lacrymans (T.K.A. Kumar & Manim.) Z.W. Ge & Zhu L. Yang (2017)
101. Leucoagaricus lahorensiformis S. Hussain, H. Ahmad, Afshan & Khalid (2018)
102. Leucoagaricus lahorensis Qasim, T. Amir & Nawaz (2015)
103. Leucoagaricus laosensis Sysouph. (2022)
104. Leucoagaricus lateritiopurpureus (Lj.N. Vassiljeva) E.F. Malysheva, Svetash. & Bulakh (2013)
105. Leucoagaricus leucothites (Vittad.) Wasser (1977)
106. Leucoagaricus lilaceus Singer (1952)
107. Leucoagaricus littoralis (Ménier) Bon & Boiffard (1976)
108. Leucoagaricus luteosquamulosus T.K.A. Kumar & Manim. (2009)
109. Leucoagaricus mairei Bon (1993)
110. Leucoagaricus majusculus T.K.A. Kumar & Manim. (2009)
111. Leucoagaricus malvaceus Heinem. (1979)
112. Leucoagaricus margaritifer Justo, Bizzi & Angelini (2021)
113. Leucoagaricus marginatus (Burl.) Boisselet (2002)
114. Leucoagaricus medioflavoides Bon (1976)
115. Leucoagaricus melanotrichus (Malençon & Bertault) Trimbach (1975)
116. Leucoagaricus meleagris (Gray) Singer (1951)
117. Leucoagaricus menieri (Sacc.) Singer (1968)
118. Leucoagaricus mexicanus Guzmán (1974)
119. Leucoagaricus morenoi Raithelh. (1987)
120. Leucoagaricus moseri (Wasser) Wasser (1978)
121. Leucoagaricus mucrocystis (Pegler) Justo, Bizzi & Angelini (2021)
122. Leucoagaricus nigrodiscus Dähncke, Contu & Vizzini (2011)
123. Leucoagaricus nivalis (W.F. Chiu) Z.W. Ge & Zhu L. Yang (2017)
124. Leucoagaricus nympharum (Kalchbr.) Bon (1977)
125. Leucoagaricus nzumbae C. Heisecke, A.A. Carvalho & M.A. Neves (2020)
126. Leucoagaricus oleicola Corriol (2015)
127. Leucoagaricus olivaceomamillatus (Rick) Singer (1954)
128. Leucoagaricus olivaceus (Kauffman) Singer (1951)
129. Leucoagaricus ooliekirrus Grgur. (1997)
130. Leucoagaricus ophthalmus Vellinga (2007)
131. Leucoagaricus orientiflavus Z.W. Ge (2010)
132. Leucoagaricus pabbiensis Usman & Khalid (2018)
133. Leucoagaricus pakistaniensis S. Jabeen & A.N. Khalid (2018)
134. Leucoagaricus paracupresseus Salom, Siquier, Planas & Espinosa (2021)
135. Leucoagaricus paraplesius Vellinga (2007)
136. Leucoagaricus pardalotus Vellinga (2010)
137. Leucoagaricus pegleri Justo, Bizzi & Angelini (2021)
138. Leucoagaricus pepinus Heinem. (1973)
139. Leucoagaricus pilatianus (Demoulin) Bon & Boiffard (1976)
140. Leucoagaricus platensis (Speg.) Raithelh. (1987)
141. Leucoagaricus pleurocystidiatus Migl. & Testoni (2000)
142. Leucoagaricus proximus E.F. Malysheva, Svetash. & Bulakh (2013)
143. Leucoagaricus pseudocinerascens (Bon) Bon (1993)
144. Leucoagaricus pseudopilatianus Migl., Rocabruna & Tabarés (2001)
145. Leucoagaricus puncticulosus Pegler (1969)
146. Leucoagaricus purpureolilacinus Huijsman (1955)
147. Leucoagaricus purpureoruber (Z.S. Bi, T.H. Li & G.Y. Zheng) Z.W. Ge & Zhu L. Yang (2017)
148. Leucoagaricus pyrrhophaeus Vellinga (2010)
149. Leucoagaricus pyrrhulus Vellinga (2010)
150. Leucoagaricus quilonensis Sathe & J.T. Daniel (1981)
151. Leucoagaricus repertus Raithelh. (1988)
152. Leucoagaricus rhodelephantinus Boisselet & Eyssart. (2020)
153. Leucoagaricus rhodocephalus (Berk.) Pegler (1975)
154. Leucoagaricus rickianus (Speg.) Singer (1973)
155. Leucoagaricus rimosovelatus Contu (1990)
156. Leucoagaricus rosabrunneus (Raithelh.) Raithelh. (1989)
157. Leucoagaricus roseilividus (Murrill) E. Ludw. (2012)
158. Leucoagaricus rosemarieae P. Mohr (2007)
159. Leucoagaricus roseoalbus (Henn.) Heinem. (1973)
160. Leucoagaricus roseolanatus (Huijsman) Bon (1978)
161. Leucoagaricus roseolus (Beeli) Heinem. (1973)
162. Leucoagaricus roseovertens Justo, Bizzi & Angelini (2021)
163. Leucoagaricus rubrobrunneus E.F. Malysheva, Svetash. & Bulakh (2013)
164. Leucoagaricus rubroconfusus Migl. & Coccia (1994)
165. Leucoagaricus rubrotinctus (Peck) Singer (1948)
166. Leucoagaricus rufosquamulosus T.K.A. Kumar & Manim. (2009)
167. Leucoagaricus sabinae Angelini, Justo & Vizzini (2015)
168. Leucoagaricus salmoneophyllus Bon & Guinb. (1993)
169. Leucoagaricus sanguineus (Beeli) Heinem. (1973)
170. Leucoagaricus sardous (Zecchin & Migl.) Consiglio & Contu (2004)
171. Leucoagaricus serenus (Fr.) Bon & Boiffard (1974)
172. Leucoagaricus sericifer (Locq.) Vellinga (2000)
173. Leucoagaricus silvestris Justo, Bizzi & Angelini (2021)
174. Leucoagaricus singeri (Bon ex Contu & Signor.) Consiglio & Contu (2004)
175. Leucoagaricus squamosus Heinem. (1973)
176. Leucoagaricus stillatus Justo, Bizzi & Angelini (2021)
177. Leucoagaricus striatulus Heinem. (1973)
178. Leucoagaricus subcretaceus Bon (1983)
179. Leucoagaricus subcrystallifer Z.W. Ge & Zhu L. Yang (2015)
180. Leucoagaricus subflavus T.K.A. Kumar & Manim. (2009)
181. Leucoagaricus subglobisporus (Contu) Consiglio & Contu (2004)
182. Leucoagaricus subhymenoderma Bon & A. Caball. (2003)
183. Leucoagaricus subolivaceus Migl. & L. Perrone (1992)
184. Leucoagaricus subpudicus Bon (1993)
185. Leucoagaricus subpurpureolilacinus Z.W. Ge & Zhu L. Yang (2015)
186. Leucoagaricus subvolvatus (Malençon & Bertault) Bon (1977)
187. Leucoagaricus sulphurellus (Pegler) B.P. Akers (2000)
188. Leucoagaricus sultanii S. Hussain, H. Ahmad & Khalid (2018)
189. Leucoagaricus tangerinus Y. Yuan & J.F. Liang (2014)
190. Leucoagaricus tener (P.D. Orton) Bon (1977)
191. Leucoagaricus testaceus Heinem. (1973)
192. Leucoagaricus thallensis Z. Khan, A. Izhar & Khalid (2023)
193. Leucoagaricus tomesensis Garrido (1988)
194. Leucoagaricus tricolor Singer (1989)
195. Leucoagaricus tropicus A.K. Dutta, Stallman & K. Acharya (2021)
196. Leucoagaricus truncatus Z.W. Ge & Zhu L. Yang (2015)
197. Leucoagaricus turgipes Justo, Bizzi & Angelini (2021)
198. Leucoagaricus umbonatus S. Hussain, H. Ahmad & Afshan (2018)
199. Leucoagaricus vassiljevae E.F. Malysheva, Svetash. & Bulakh (2013)
200. Leucoagaricus velutinus (Beeli) Heinem. (1973)
201. Leucoagaricus vindobonensis (Tratt.) L.A. Parra (2013)
202. Leucoagaricus viridariorum G. Muñoz, A. Caball., Salom & Vizzini (2015)
203. Leucoagaricus viriditinctus (Berk. & Broome) J.F. Liang, Zhu L. Yang & J. Xu (2010)
204. Leucoagaricus viscidulus (Heinem.) Consiglio & Contu (2004)
205. Leucoagaricus volvatus Bon & A. Caball. (1995)
206. Leucoagaricus weberi J.J. Muchovej, Della Lucia & R.M.C. Muchovej (1991)
207. Leucoagaricus wichanskyi (Pilát) Bon & Boiffard (1990)
