= Leucoagaricus moseri =

Scientific classification
- Domain: Eukaryota
- Kingdom: Fungi
- Division: Basidiomycota
- Class: Agaricomycetes
- Order: Agaricales
- Family: Agaricaceae
- Genus: Leucoagaricus
- Species: L. moseri

Binomial name
- Leucoagaricus moseri (Wasser) Wasser (1978)

Synonyms
- Lepiota moseri Wasser (1975); Sericeomyces moseri (Wasser) Contu (1991)

Species of fungus

Leucoagaricus moseri is a species of agaric fungus found in Europe. The species was originally described as Lepiota moseri by Solomon Wasser in 1975. The specific epithet honours Austrian mycologist Meinhard Moser. Wasser transferred the fungus to the genus Leucoagaricus in 1978.

== See also ==
- List of Leucoagaricus species
