= Leucoagaricus flavus =

Scientific classification
- Kingdom: Fungi
- Division: Basidiomycota
- Class: Agaricomycetes
- Order: Agaricales
- Family: Agaricaceae
- Genus: Leucoagaricus
- Species: L. flavus

Binomial name
- Leucoagaricus flavus Sysouph. & Thongkl. (2022)

Species of fungus

Leucoagaricus flavus Mycological characteristics
- Gills on hymenium
- Cap is umbonate or flat
- Hymenium is free
- Stipe has a ring
- Ecology is saprotrophic
- Edibility is unknown

Leucoagaricus flavus is a species of mushroom-producing fungus in the family Agaricaceae.

== Taxonomy ==
It was described in 2022 by the mycologists Phongeun Sysouphanthong and Naritsada Thongklang who classified it as Leucoagaricus flavus.

== Description ==
Leucoagaricus flavus is a small dapperling mushroom with thin (2mm thick) white flesh.

Cap: 1.5–2 cm wide, umbonate and expanding to flat or plano-convex with a slight umbo. The surface is pale yellow with a fibrillose yellow coating that may peel to reveal a whitish to pale yellow background whilst the centre umbo is smooth with a slightly more pronounced yellow tone.The cap margins are straight and fibrillose with the fibrils being of the same colour as the centre, sulcate striations and fringes are present when mature. Gills: Free, slightly crowded and pale to pastel yellow. They are up to 1.5mm wide, have an eroded edge and bulge in the middle (ventricose). Stem: 3-3.5 cm long and 3-5mm thick, cylindrical or tapering upwards slightly from the wider base. The surface is yellowish-white with a fibrillose or soft, hairy coating of the same colour and the interior is hollow with white fibrils inside. The stem ring is located towards the middle of the stem (median) and has a fibrillose coating the same colour as the cap surface. Spores: 4.8-5.3 x 3.5-4 μm. Ellipsoidal to ovoid with a slightly thick wall and no germ pore. Hyaline. Dextrinoid, congophilous, cyanophilous and metachromatic. Basidia: 13-16 x 6–7.5 μm. Clavate. Smell: It has a distinct but soft flowery smell.

== Etymology ==
The specific epithet flavus derives from the Latin flavus meaning yellow. This refers to the colour of the mushrooms.

== Habitat and distribution ==
The specimens studied were found in deciduous and bamboo forests in Laos during the rainy season of October to November where they were growing solitary on soil.

== Similar species ==
- Leucoagaricus orientiflavus is similar in appearance and closely related but can be distinguished via microscopic details.
- Leucoagaricus houaynhangensis differs via the presence of the greenish colour to the cap and grey to black scales as well as microscopic details. Leucoagaricus sulphurellus, Leucoagaricus viridiflavoides and Leucoagaricus viridiflavus are similarly distinguished.
- Leucocoprinus birnbaumii and other yellowish species like Leucocoprinus flavescens can be distinguished by the presence of distinct striations on their caps.
