= Leucocoprinus viridiflavoides =

Scientific classification
- Kingdom: Fungi
- Division: Basidiomycota
- Class: Agaricomycetes
- Order: Agaricales
- Family: Agaricaceae
- Genus: Leucocoprinus
- Species: L. viridiflavoides

Binomial name
- Leucocoprinus viridiflavoides E.Ludw. (2012)

Synonyms
- Leucoagaricus viridiflavoides B.P.Akers & Angels (2000)

Species of fungus

Leucocoprinus viridiflavoides Mycological characteristics
- Gills on hymenium
- Cap is convex or umbonate
- Hymenium is free
- Stipe has a ring
- Spore print is yellow
- Ecology is saprotrophic
- Edibility is unknown

Leucocoprinus viridiflavoides is a species of mushroom producing fungus in the family Agaricaceae. It may still be known as Leucoagaricus viridiflavoides.

== Taxonomy ==
It was first described in 2000 by Brian P. Akers and Sherri A. Angels who classified it as Leucoagaricus viridiflavoides.

In 2012 it was reclassified as Leucocoprinus viridiflavoides by Erhard Ludwig.

== Description ==
Leucocoprinus viridiflavoides is a small dapperling mushroom with yellow flesh that discolours olive or green when damaged or cut.

Cap: 1.6–3.5 cm wide, convex to nearly planar and obtusely umbonate. The surface colour is quite variable and may be a dull brownish to gray to nearly black to greenish colour. It can be almost smooth or covered in minute, grainy scales which are more concentrated at the central disc and thinner or paler towards the edges and may rarely split into concentric rings of scales exposing the yellow flesh beneath. The cap surface may become slightly sticky when moist and both the flesh and the surface bruise bluish-green when handled or with damage and it dries to a greenish or yellowish grey. The cap margins occasionally have minute striations but are often without any striations, which is unusual for Leucocoprinus species and more consistent with Leucoagaricus. The edges may often split almost to the disc and may sometimes present with an appendiculate margin, that is with veil fragments on the cap edges. Stem: 1.8–4.5 cm tall and up to 3mm thick and roughly equal in thickness across the whole stem. The interior of the stem is hollow whilst the surface is sulphur yellow but likewise discolours bluish-green when handled, it is smooth but sometimes minutely scaly at the base on young specimens. The membranous stem ring is sulphur yellow and located towards the top of the stem (superior) but it sometimes disappears. Gills: Free, close to subdistant and pale yellow but likewise bruising bluish green when touched. Upon cutting the gills discolour to a dull pink and they dry to yellow with bluish-green or yellowish-gray edges. Smell: Mild and pleasant. Spore print: Pale yellow. Spores: Ellipsoid to ovoid to amygdaliform with an indistinct germ pore. Detrinoid. 5.3–11 x 3.4–5.1 μm.

== Habitat and distribution ==
L. viridiflavoides is scarcely recorded and little known and is considered to be a rare species. The specimens studied by Akers and Angels were found in Florida where they were growing scattered on the ground in the San Felasco Hammock Preserve State Park.

== Similar species ==
There are a small number of similarly green bruising greenish-yellow species including Leucoagaricus sulphurellus, Leucocoprinus viridiflavus, Leucoagaricus viriditinctus, Lepiota cyanescens and Leucoagaricus houaynhangensis. The genera in which they should be placed is not necessarily certain and some of these species may still be known under previous classifications within Lepiota, Leucocoprinus or Leucoagaricus or may be subject to reclassification as some of these species are poorly documented and all are scarcely observed. As the macroscopic characteristics of these species are similar and unusual within these genera it may take microscopic analysis to distinguish them.
