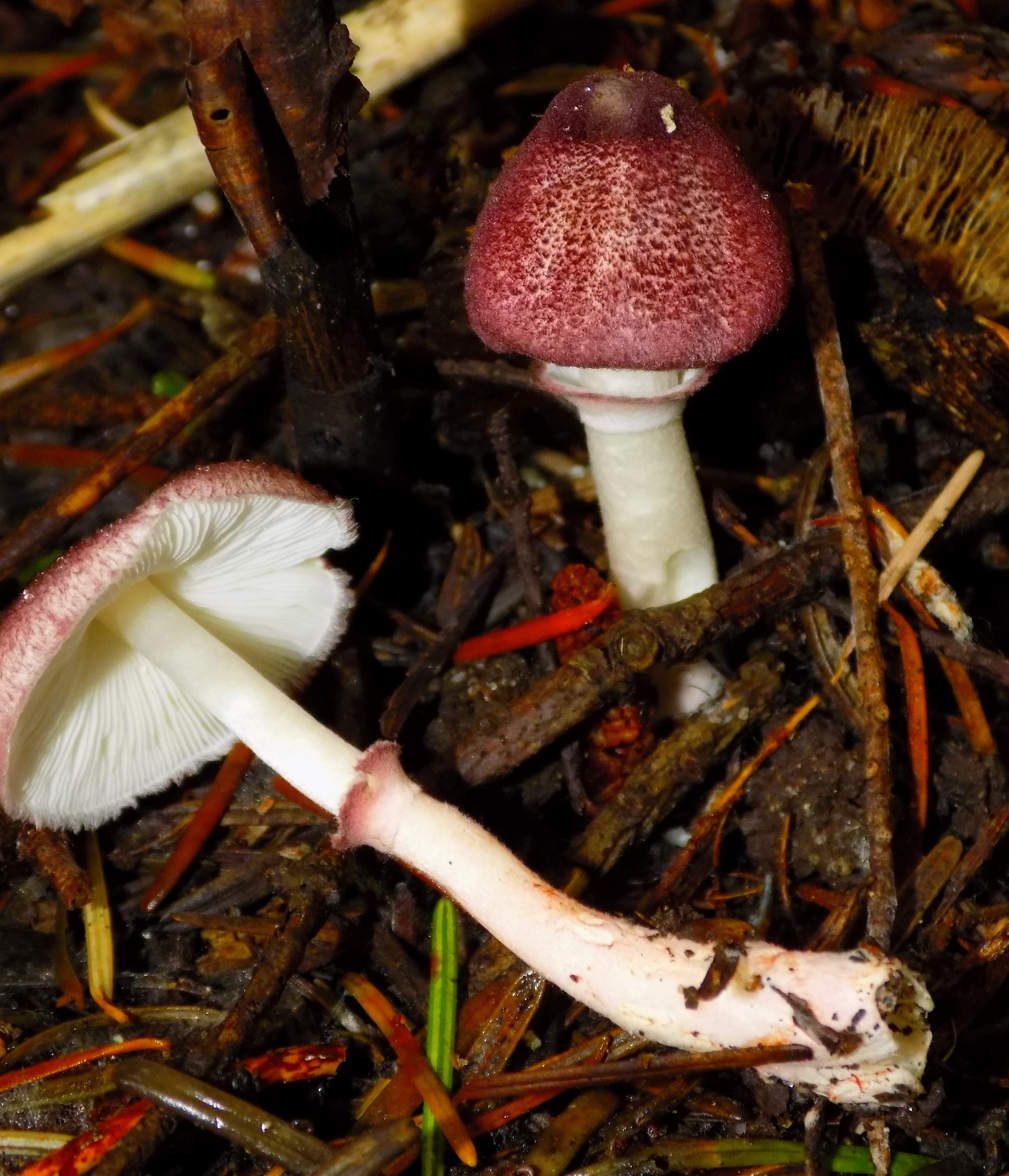

Scientific classification
- Domain: Eukaryota
- Kingdom: Fungi
- Division: Basidiomycota
- Class: Agaricomycetes
- Order: Agaricales
- Family: Agaricaceae
- Genus: Leucoagaricus
- Species: L. roseilividus

Binomial name
- Leucoagaricus roseilividus (Murrill) E.Ludw.

Synonyms
- Lepiota roseilivida Murrill; Lepiota roseolivida

= Leucoagaricus roseilividus =

Species of fungus

Leucoagaricus roseilividus Mycological characteristics
- Gills on hymenium
- Cap is ovate or conical
- Hymenium is free
- Stipe has a ring
- Spore print is white
- Edibility is unknown

Leucoagaricus roseilividus, commonly known as the rosy parasol, is a species of mushroom in the family Agaricaceae. It is found in the Pacific Northwest.

== Taxonomy ==
Leucoagaricus roseilividus was first described as Lepiota roseilivida by William Murrill in 1912. However, it was later reclassified as Leucoagaricus roseilividus by Erhard Ludwig in 2012.

== Description ==
The cap of Leucoagaricus roseilividus is fibrillose. It is purplish in the center and wine-colored or pink outwards. It starts out egg-shaped or hemispheric, later becoming conical. The gills are whitish. The stipe is white, and it is 4–9 centimeters long and 0.3 to 0.9 cm wide. There is a thin ring around the stem that is usually pointed upwards. It sometimes disappears when the mushroom gets older. Lepiota decorata is similar, but is larger and less hairy.

== Habitat and ecology ==
Leucoagaricus roseilividus is found in coastal forests in the Pacific Northwest. It is found under coastal redwood and Monterey cypress trees. It is also found in cedar and alder leaf litter.
