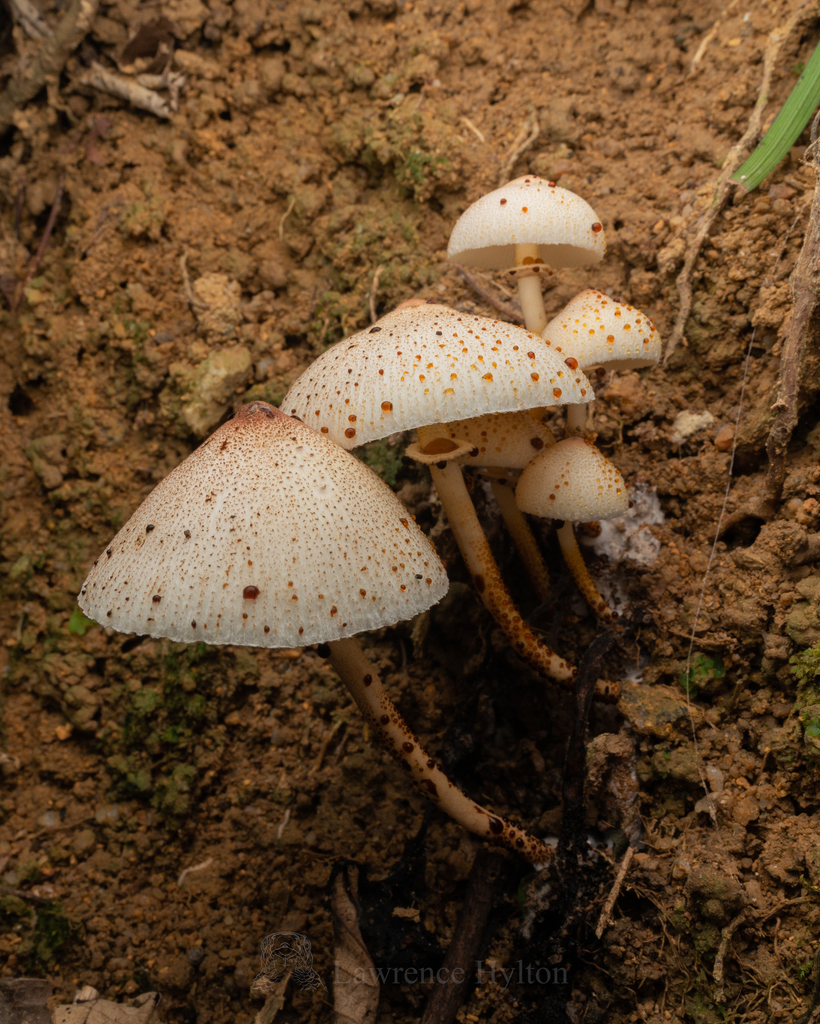
- The type species Candelolepiota sinica

Scientific classification
- Kingdom: Fungi
- Division: Basidiomycota
- Class: Agaricomycetes
- Order: Agaricales
- Family: Agaricaceae
- Genus: Candelolepiota; Kun L. Yang, Jia Y. Lin & Zhu L. Yang (2024)

Type species
- Candelolepiota sinica (Peck) Kun L. Yang, Jia Y. Lin & Zhu L. Yang 2024

= Candelolepiota =

Genus of fungi

Candelolepiota is a genus of mushroom-forming fungi in the family Agaricaceae.

== Taxonomy ==
This genus was described in 2024 by the Chinese mycologists Kun L. Yang, Jia Y. Lin & Zhu L. Yang.
