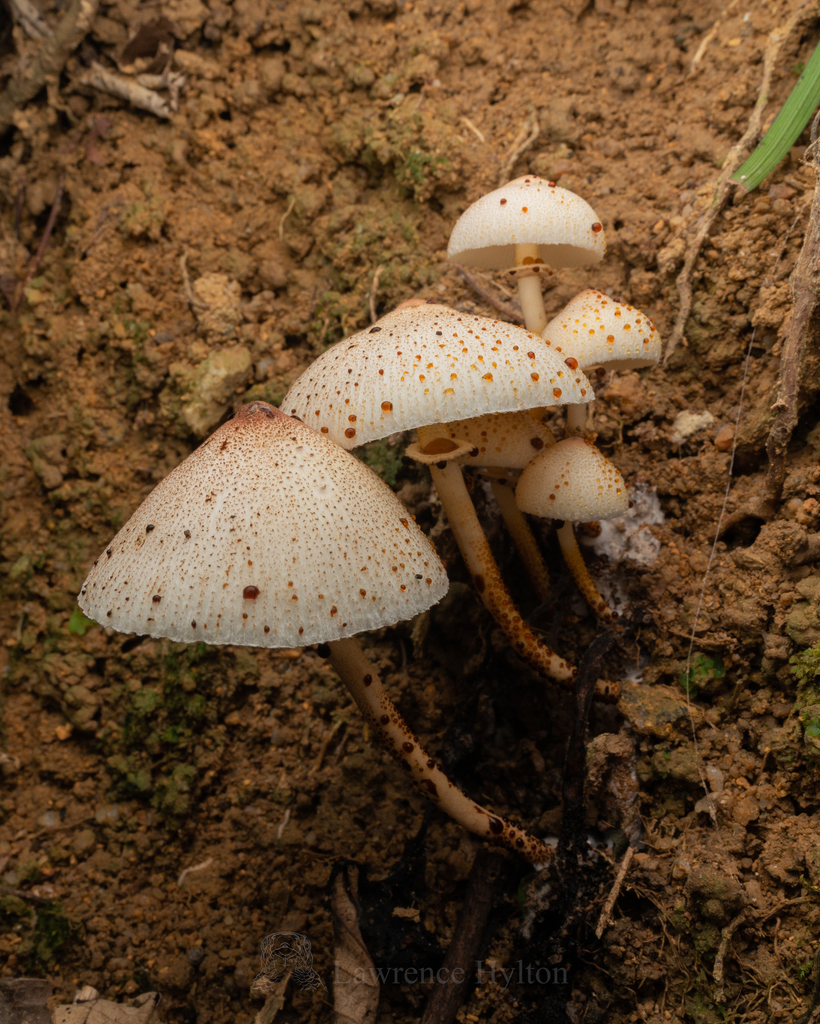

Scientific classification
- Kingdom: Fungi
- Division: Basidiomycota
- Class: Agaricomycetes
- Order: Agaricales
- Family: Agaricaceae
- Genus: Candelolepiota
- Species: C. sinica

Binomial name
- Candelolepiota sinica (J.Z. Ying) Kun L. Yang, Jia Y. Lin & Zhu L. Yang (2024)

Synonyms
- Chamaeota sinica J.Z. Ying, Mycotaxon 54: 303 (1995); Leucocoprinus lacrymans T.K.A. Kumar & Manim (2004); Leucoagaricus sinicus Zhu L. Yang (2007); Leucoagaricus lacrymans Z.W. Ge & Zhu L. Yang (2017)

= Candelolepiota sinica =

Species of fungus

Candelolepiota sinica
- Mycological characteristics
- Gills on hymenium
- Cap is campanulate or flat
- Hymenium is free
- Stipe has a ring
- Spore print is white
- Ecology is saprotrophic
- Edibility is unknown

Candelolepiota sinica is a species of mushroom producing fungus in the family Agaricaceae. It was formerly known as Leucoagaricus lacrymans and Leucoagaricus sinicus.

== Taxonomy ==
It was described as new to science in 2004 by the Indian mycologists T.K. Arun Kumar & Patinjareveettil Manimohan who classified it as Leucocoprinus lacrymans. This went on to be reclassified as Leucoagaricus lacrymans in 2017 by the Chinese mycologists Zai-Wei Ge & Zhu-Liang Yang based on phylogenetic analysis.

However the species had already been described as Chamaeota sinica by the Chinese mycologist Jian-zhe Ying in 1995. This species went on to be reclassified as Leucoagaricus sinicus in 2007 by the Chinese mycologist Zhu L. Yang.

In 2024 these forgotten synonyms were rediscovered and the species was reclassified as Candelolepiota sinica by the Chinese mycologists Kun L. Yang, Jia Y. Lin & Zhu L. Yang, becoming the type species of the newly created Candelolepiota genus.

== Description ==
Cap: 3–8.3 cm wide, starting cylindrical but truncate on the top and expanding to become campanulate to convex and finally flattening with age whilst often retaining a distinct umbo. The surface is white to creamy coloured and covered with minute, flattened (appressed) cinnamon to rusty brown to purplish brown scales which are sparser at the margins but denser towards the centre of the cap where they become more granular (granulose) or slightly velvety (velutinate). The cap margins have striations (sulcate-striate) and are entire, starting incurved before flattening with age and becoming fissile (prone to splitting slightly). The cap edges are often covered with yellow to reddish brown guttation the same as that seen on the stem. The cap flesh is white or whitish and thin (3mm thick) and discolours to a pale orange when cut or a greyish orange with longer exposure on cut surfaces. Stem: 4–12 cm tall and 5-6mm thick running almost equally along the length or tapering slightly towards the top. The surface is white or a dirty white colour and darkens to brownish with age and is velvety when young (velutinous to villose) but has some flattened fibrils when older (appressed-fibrillose). It is often covered with beads of yellow to reddish brown guttation. The interior is hollow and the base of the stem can display white mycelial cords (rhizomorphs). The membranous stem ring is located towards the top of the stem (superior). Kumar and Manimohan note the ring as being white and usually disappearing without a trace (evanescent) whilst Ge and Yang state that it is brown and persistent. Gills: Free without a collar, moderately crowded and white but aging to a yellowish white and then discolouring reddish with age or upon drying. They are thin (up to 4mm wide) and may bulge in the middle (ventricose). The gills are of two or three different lengths and the edges are finely fringed and may be tinted greyish on older specimens. Smell: Indistinct. Spore print: White. Spores: Ellipsoidal to broadly ellipsoidal when viewed from the side and ellipsoidal, ovoid or subglobose front on. They are hyaline and smooth with a distinct germ pore. Dextrinoid. 5-13 x 4.5-11μm. Basidia: 4 spored.

== Habitat and distribution ==
The specimens studied by Kumar and Manimohan were collected in Kerala State, India and were found growing on soil and decaying leaf litter around the base of coconut trees where they were solitary or growing in clusters. Ge and Yang not that the species grows in tropical forests and is known from India and China.

As of January 2026 iNaturalist contains observations of this species from India, China and South East Asia as well as a few observations from elsewhere suggesting the possibility of introduction into other warm regions.

== Etymology ==
The specific epithet lacrymans derives from Latin and means weeping, in reference to the guttation this species presents with.

== Similar species ==
- Macropsalliota tropica may be confused with this species.
- Leucocoprinus zelanicus is noted as being similar however is distinguished by the smooth stem, the lack of guttation on the cap and stem as well as microscopic differences including a smaller spore size.
- Leucocoprinus cepistipes has a similar cap and may be confused for this species.
