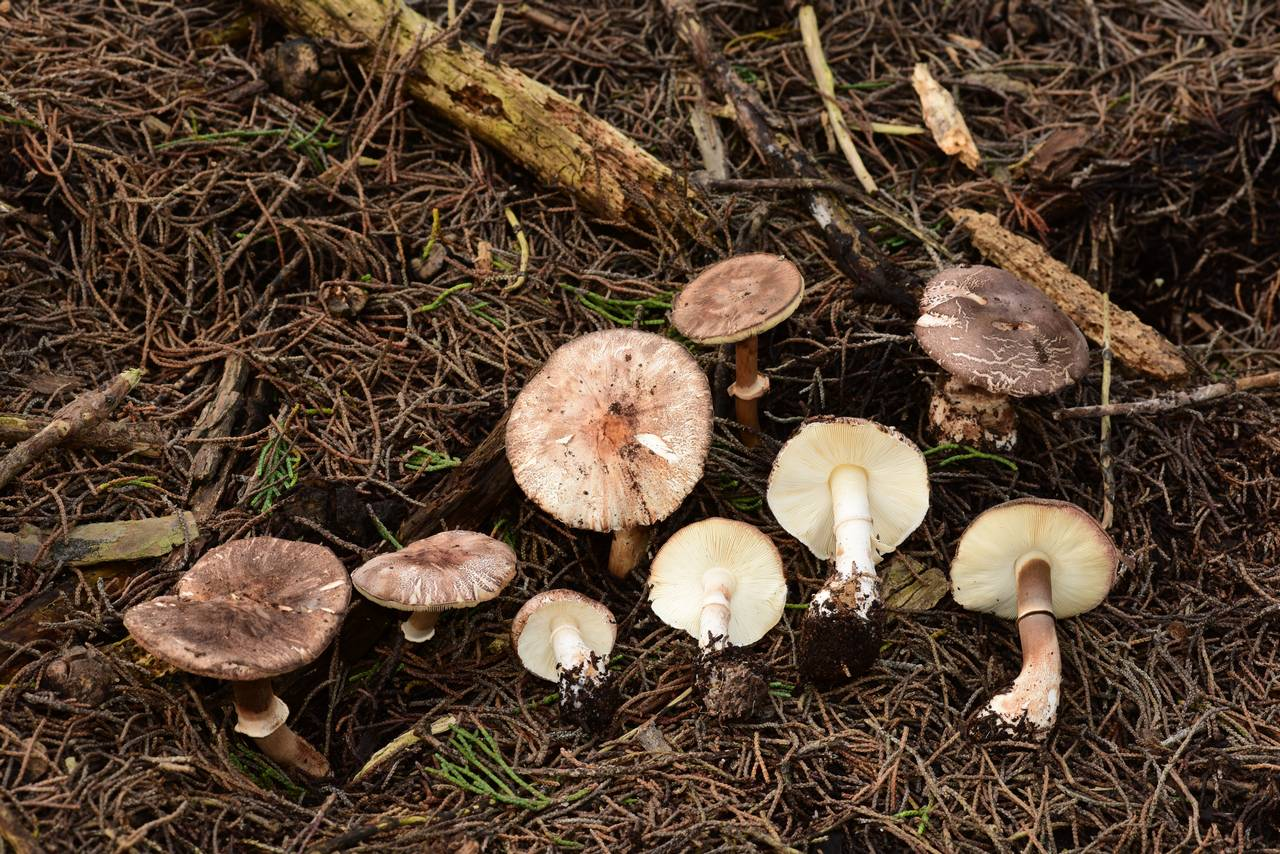
- Leucocoprinus cupresseus from Crystal Springs Watershed, San Mateo Co., California, USA

Scientific classification
- Kingdom: Fungi
- Division: Basidiomycota
- Class: Agaricomycetes
- Order: Agaricales
- Family: Agaricaceae
- Genus: Leucocoprinus
- Species: L. cupresseus

Binomial name
- Leucocoprinus cupresseus (Burl.) Asif Saba and Vellinga

Synonyms
- Lepiota cupressea Burl. Leucoagaricus cupresseus Boisselet and Guinb.

= Leucocoprinus cupresseus =

Leucocoprinus cupresseus
- Mycological characteristics
- Gills on hymenium
- Cap is convex or umbonate
- Hymenium is free
- Stipe has a ring
- Spore print is white
- Edibility is unknown

Leucocoprinus cupresseus is a species of mushroom in the genus Leucocoprinus.

== Taxonomy ==
Leucocoprinus cupresseus was first described by Gertrude S. Burlingham in 1945. However, it was later transferred to the genus Leucoagaricus in 2001, and finally to Leucocoprinus in 2024.

== Description ==
The cap of Leucocoprinus cupresseus is brown, ranging from pinkish to reddish. It starts out round, before expanding to convex or flat. It is also slightly umbonate. The stipe is 4–12 centimeters long and 1–2 centimeters wide, and bulbous at the base. There is a ring around the stipe, and the gills are free. They start out white, later becoming creamier as the mushroom ages. The gills bruise yellow, before turning orangish red, while the flesh of the mushroom bruises reddish or orange. The spore print is white.

== Habitat and ecology ==
Leucocoprinus cupresseus is found in leaf litter, often in urban areas. It often grows under Monterey cypress.

== Gallery ==
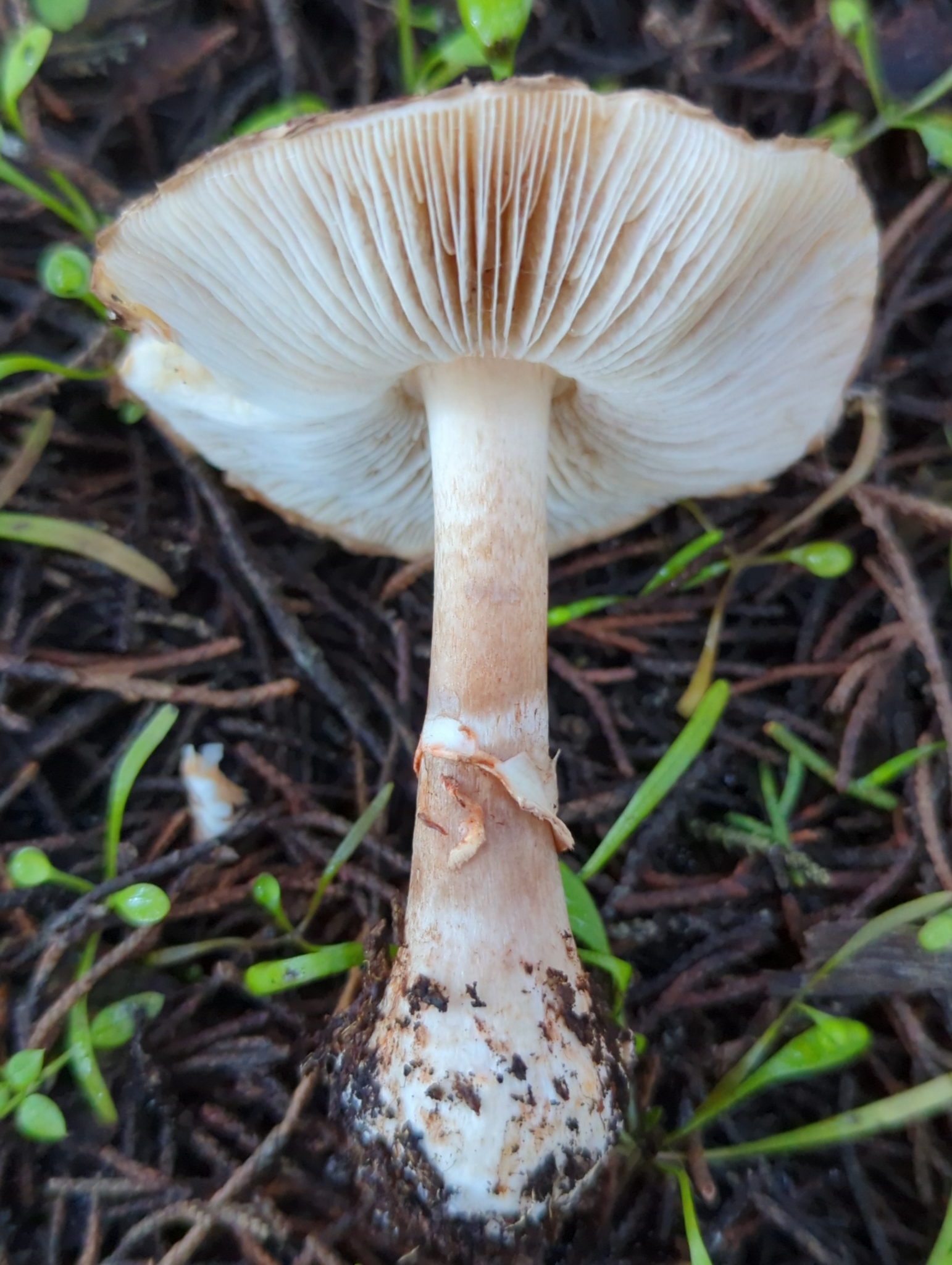
Leucocoprinus cupresseus from San Carlos, CA 94070, USA
