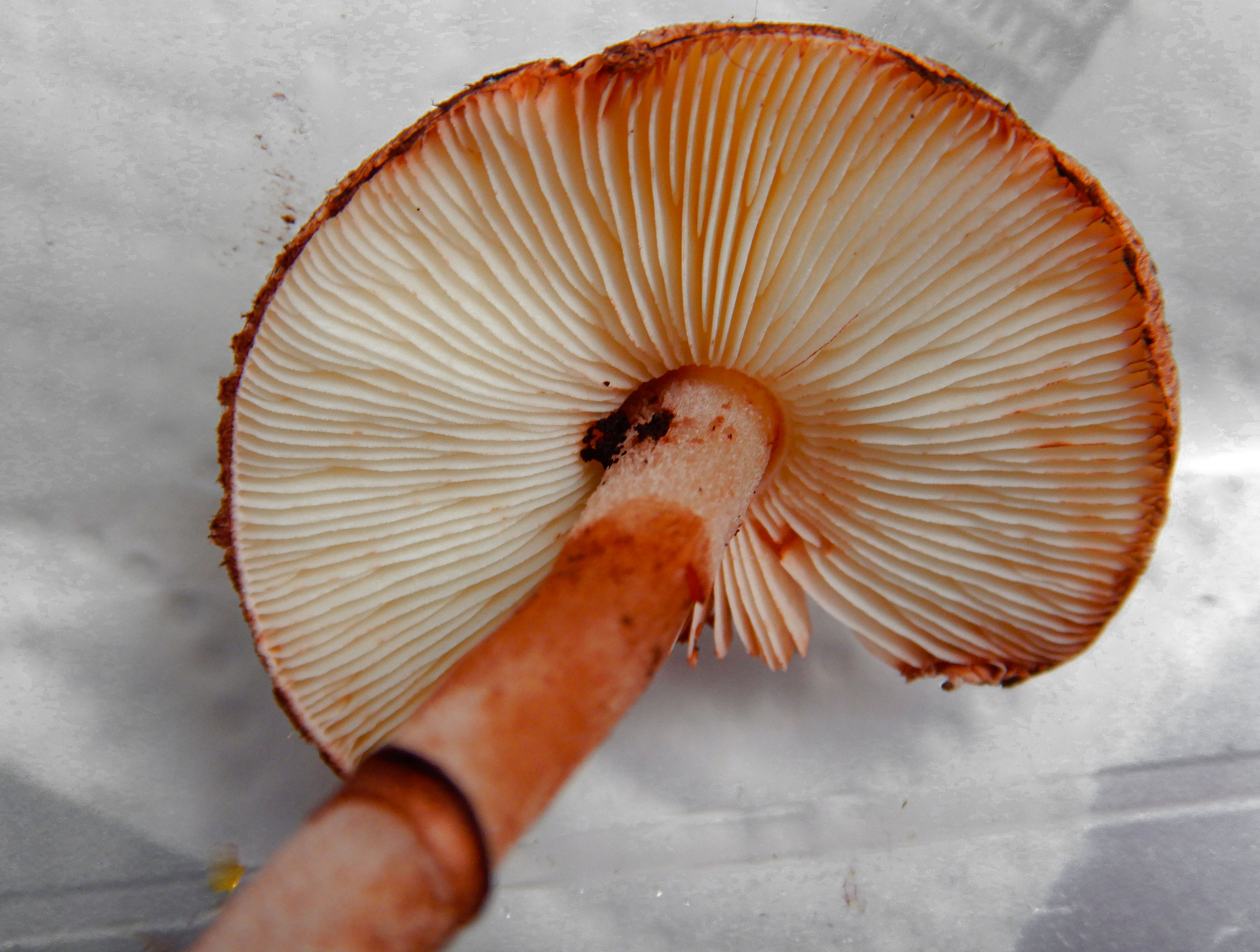

Scientific classification
- Kingdom: Fungi
- Division: Basidiomycota
- Class: Agaricomycetes
- Order: Agaricales
- Family: Agaricaceae
- Genus: Leucoagaricus
- Species: L. croceovelutinus

Binomial name
- Leucoagaricus croceovelutinus (Bon & Boiffard) Bon (1976)

Synonyms
- Leucocoprinus croceovelutinus Bon & Boiffard (1972); Leucocoprinus croceovelutinus var. diversisporus D.A.Reid (1990)

= Leucoagaricus croceovelutinus =

Species of fungus

Leucoagaricus croceovelutinus Mycological characteristics
- Gills on hymenium
- Cap is convex or flat
- Hymenium is free
- Stipe has a ring
- Spore print is white
- Ecology is saprotrophic
- Edibility is unknown

Leucoagaricus croceovelutinus is a species of mushroom-producing fungus in the family Agaricaceae.

== Taxonomy ==
It was described in 1972 by the French mycologists Marcel Bon and Jacques Boiffard who classified it as Leucocoprinus croceovelutinus.

It was reclassified by Marcel Bon in 1976 as Leucoagaricus croceovelutinus.

The variation Leucocoprinus croceovelutinus var. diversisporus was described in 1990 by the British mycologist Derek Reid but is now considered a synonym.

== Description ==
Leucoagaricus croceovelutinus is a small dapperling mushroom with thin white or pale yellow flesh that discolours red within a minute of being exposed. This reaction is hastened by exposure to ammonia fumes but does not result in a green colour like some similar species.

Cap: 3–6 cm wide, starting convex before flattening with a very slight umbo. The surface is covered with adpressed red-brown scattered scales against a white background with a darker red-brown centre disc. Upon contact or age the surface discolours red obscuring the white background colour and making for a burgundy tone against the brown. Orange to purple tones may also come through with bruising or age. Gills: Free, crowded, ventricose and white or pale yellow but orange red on bruising. The gill edges become brown with age or upon handling and this is most noticeable towards the cap margins. When dry they become dark grey. Stem: 7-10cm tall and 4-5mm thick tapering upwards from the swollen, club shaped base. The surface is pure white and silky at first sometimes with a rosy colour at the base but it soon becomes rose coloured across the length except at the apex, then reddish-brown and brown at the base, which finally becomes blackish-purple. When dry this darker colour spreads over the entire stem. The interior flesh is white but discolours orange-red when exposed. The pendant, membranous stem ring is generally persistent and is located towards the middle or top of the stem (median to superior), it is white with a wine-red margin but discolours dull red with age. Spore print: White. Spores: (7) 7.5–8.5 (9) x 3.5–4.5 μm. Amygdaliform to ovoid without a germ pore. Dextrinoid.

== Habitat and distribution ==
The specimens studied by Bon and Boiffard were found on humus under deciduous trees near the Le Veillon beach near Talmont Saint Hilaire, France. Reid suggests that it may be associated with Robinia, Quercus and Ligustrum trees based on the limited recorded collections available at the time which were in France, Netherlands and Hungary. The species has also been recorded in Bulgaria.
