= Leucocoprinus griseosquamosus =

Scientific classification
- Kingdom: Fungi
- Division: Basidiomycota
- Class: Agaricomycetes
- Order: Agaricales
- Family: Agaricaceae
- Genus: Leucocoprinus
- Species: L. griseosquamosus

Binomial name
- Leucocoprinus griseosquamosus (Sysouph. & Thongkl.) Kun L. Yang, Jia Y. Lin & Zhu L. Yang (2024)

Synonyms
- Leucoagaricus griseosquamosus Sysouph. & Thongkl. (2022)

Species of fungus

Leucocoprinus griseosquamosus
- Mycological characteristics
- Gills on hymenium
- Cap is umbonate or flat
- Hymenium is free
- Stipe has a ring
- Spore print is white
- Ecology is saprotrophic
- Edibility is unknown

Leucocoprinus griseosquamosus is a species of mushroom-producing fungus in the family Agaricaceae.

== Taxonomy ==
It was described in 2022 by the mycologists Phongeun Sysouphanthong and Naritsada Thongklang who classified it as Leucoagaricus griseosquamosus.

In 2024 the species was reclassified as Leucocoprinus griseosquamosus by the Chinese mycologists Kun L. Yang, Jia Y. Lin & Zhu L. Yang.

== Description ==
Leucocoprinus griseosquamosus is a small dapperling mushroom with thin (1mm thick) white flesh that discolours reddish-white when cut.

Cap: 1–2 cm wide, umbonate and expanding to flat with a slight umbo. The surface is white and covered with grey to greyish-brown scales which are darker at the smooth or slightly coarse umbo. It discolours reddish-white when touched or damaged. The margins are straight and have white fibrils and sulcate striations when mature. Gills: Free, moderately crowded and white. They are 2-4mm wide, have an eroded edge and bulge in the middle (ventricose). When touched they discolour reddish-white. Stem: 2.3-3.3 cm long and 2.5-3.5mm thick, cylindrical and tapering upwards slightly from the slightly wider base. The surface is white with a white fibrillose coating and likewise discolours reddish-white when touched and the interior is hollow with white fibrils inside. The white, fibrillose stem ring is located towards the top of the stem (superior) but is fragile and may disappear when mature. Spore print: White. Spores: 6–7.5 x 4-4.5 μm. Ellipsoidal to ovoid with a slightly thick wall. Hyaline. Dextrinoid, congophilous, cyanophilous and metachromatic. Basidia: 14-17 x 7-8 μm. Clavate, 4 spored.

== Etymology ==
The specific epithet griseosquamosus derives from the Latin griseus meaning grey and squamosa meaning scales. This refers to the colour of scales on the cap of the mushrooms.

== Habitat and distribution ==
The specimens studied were found in deciduous forests in Laos during the rainy season where they were growing solitary or in small groups on soil.

== Similar species ==
- Leucoagaricus melanotrichus is similar but has a grey cap background with purplish-brown scales. It was documented from Morocco and may also be found in Europe.
- Leucocoprinus heinemannii has a similar colouration but distinct striations on the cap.
- Lepiota atrodisca has darker scales with a striate margin that is prone to splitting and a black margin on the annulus.
