= Leucoagaricus tricolor =

Scientific classification
- Domain: Eukaryota
- Kingdom: Fungi
- Division: Basidiomycota
- Class: Agaricomycetes
- Order: Agaricales
- Family: Agaricaceae
- Genus: Leucoagaricus
- Species: L. tricolor

Binomial name
- Leucoagaricus tricolor Singer (1989)

Species of fungus

Leucoagaricus tricolor Mycological characteristics
- Gills on hymenium
- Cap is convex
- Hymenium is free
- Stipe has a ring
- Spore print is white
- Ecology is saprotrophic
- Edibility is unknown

Leucoagaricus tricolor is a species of mushroom producing fungus in the family Agaricaceae.

== Taxonomy ==
It was described in 1989 by the German mycologist Rolf Singer who classified it as Leucoagaricus tricolor.

== Description ==
Leucoagaricus tricolor is a small dapperling mushroom with thin whitish flesh.

Cap: 6mm wide and convex. The surface is purple with a paler margin and a purple fibrillose coating. Gills: Crowded, free, pale grey drying to brown-grey. Stem: 14cm long and 0.6mm thick. The surface is white with a powdery (pruinose) coating. The stem ring is white and also pruinose. Spores: Ellipsoidal with a double wall and obvious germ pore. Dextrinoid. (7.5) 8.2-9 x 4.5-5.2 μm. Basidia: 24-27 x 7.5-9.5μm. Four spored.

== Habitat and distribution ==
The specimens studied by Singer were found growing on clay soil in the tropical forests of Brazil, 30km North of Manaus.
