= Leucocoprinus laosensis =

Scientific classification
- Kingdom: Fungi
- Division: Basidiomycota
- Class: Agaricomycetes
- Order: Agaricales
- Family: Agaricaceae
- Genus: Leucocoprinus
- Species: L. laosensis

Binomial name
- Leucocoprinus laosensis (Sysouph.) Kun L. Yang, Jia Y. Lin & Zhu L. Yang (2024)

Synonyms
- Leucoagaricus laosensis Sysouph. (2022)

Species of fungus

Leucocoprinus laosensis
- Mycological characteristics
- Gills on hymenium
- Cap is convex or flat
- Hymenium is free
- Stipe has a ring
- Spore print is white
- Ecology is saprotrophic
- Edibility is unknown

Leucocoprinus laosensis is a species of mushroom-producing fungus in the family Agaricaceae.

== Taxonomy ==
It was described in 2022 by the mycologist Phongeun Sysouphanthong who classified it as Leucoagaricus laosensis.

In 2024 the species was reclassified as Leucocoprinus griseosquamosus by the Chinese mycologists Kun L. Yang, Jia Y. Lin & Zhu L. Yang.

== Description ==
Leucocoprinus laosensis is a small dapperling mushroom with a brown scaly cap and thin (up to 3mm wide) white flesh.

Cap: 1.5–3 cm wide, starting convex to sub-umbonate with a small umbo. As it matures, the cap expands to become flat or plano-convex with only a slight, low umbo. The surface is covered with brown fibrillose scales on a white background, which are denser and darker in the center, creating a broad, dark brown area that lightens toward the margins. The margins are straight, with sulcate striations, and may be appendiculate with white and light brown veil remnants.

Gills: Free, crowded, and white, with an eroded edge and a ventricose bulge, measuring 4–6 mm wide.

Stem: 2.5–3.5 cm long and 5–8 mm thick, tapering upwards from a bulbous base 12 mm wide. The surface is white, with a white fibrillose coating along its length, but with light brown to dark brown fibrillose scales near the base. The exterior is occasionally covered with transparent droplets, and the interior is white and hollow. The membranous, white stem ring is located toward or above the middle of the stem (median to superior) and is pendant, with light brown to brown fibrillose scales on its edges.

Spore print: White.

Spores: 7–7.5 × 4.3–5 μm, ellipsoidal to ovoid or slightly amygdaliform, with a thick wall. Hyaline, dextrinoid, congophilous, cyanophilous, and metachromatic.

Basidia: 17–20 × 7–8 μm, clavate, and 4-spored.

== Etymology ==
The specific epithet laosensis is named in reference to the location in which this species was found, Laos.

== Habitat and distribution ==
The specimens studied were found growing in Northern Laos where they were growing on soil solitary or in small clusters.
