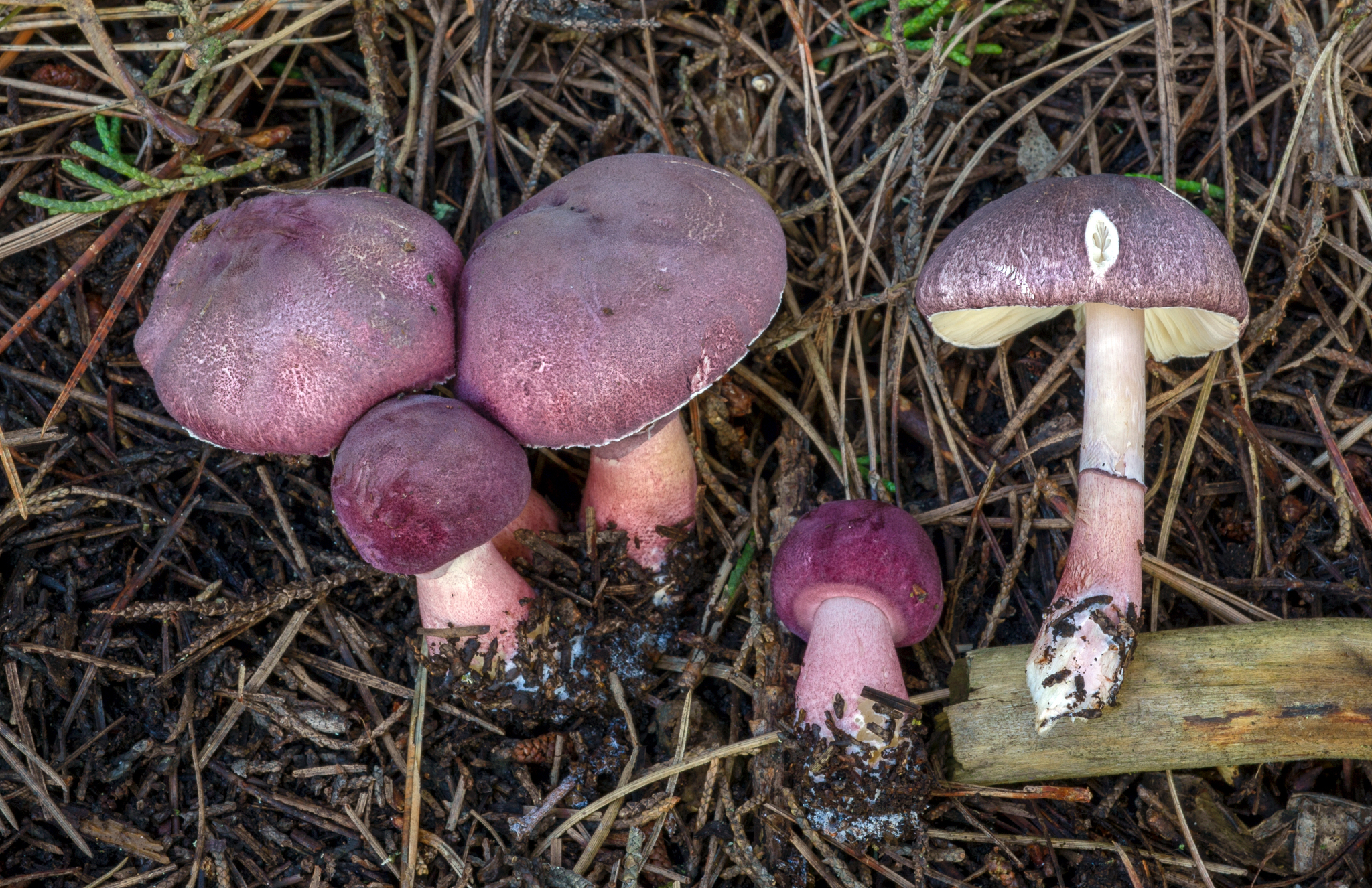
- San Mateo County, California, 2018

Scientific classification
- Kingdom: Fungi
- Division: Basidiomycota
- Class: Agaricomycetes
- Order: Agaricales
- Family: Agaricaceae
- Genus: Lepiota
- Species: L. decorata

Binomial name
- Lepiota decorata Zeller, 1929

Synonyms
- Lepiota pulcherrima, 1922

= Lepiota decorata =

Species of fungus

Lepiota decorata
- Mycological characteristics
- Gills on hymenium
- Cap is convex
- Hymenium is free
- Stipe has a ring
- Spore print is white
- Edibility is unknown

Lepiota decorata, also known as the pink parasol, is an uncommon species of gilled mushroom found in North America. The cap of L. decorata usually has a speckled violet pattern, stains orange when scratched, and is about 4 to 8 cm in diameter.

Lepiota decorata is often found in rich soil and leaf litter below trees including coast live oak, alder, eucalyptus, and conifer. A similar, separate, as-yet-undescribed species is associated with Monterey cypress. Leucoagaricus roseolividus, a much more common mushroom, has a superficially similar appearance. L. decorata is possibly properly a Leucoagaricus but has not yet been moved over. Lepiota decorata was first described in Mycologia magazine by S. M. Zeller in 1929.
