= Leucocoprinus viridiflavus =

Scientific classification
- Kingdom: Fungi
- Division: Basidiomycota
- Class: Agaricomycetes
- Order: Agaricales
- Family: Agaricaceae
- Genus: Leucocoprinus
- Species: L. viridiflavus

Binomial name
- Leucocoprinus viridiflavus (Petch) E.Ludw. (2012)

Synonyms
- Lepiota viridiflava Petch (1917); Leucoagaricus viridiflavus T.K.A.Kumar & Manim. (2009)

Species of fungus

Leucocoprinus viridiflavus Mycological characteristics
- Gills on hymenium
- Cap is convex or umbonate
- Hymenium is free
- Stipe has a ring
- Ecology is saprotrophic
- Edibility is unknown

Leucocoprinus viridiflavus is a species of mushroom producing fungus in the family Agaricaceae. It may also be known as Leucoagaricus viridiflavus.

== Taxonomy ==
It was first described in 1917 by the English mycologist Thomas Petch who classified it was Lepiota viridiflava.

In 2009 it was reclassified as Leucoagaricus viridiflavus by T.K. Arun Kumar and Patinjareveettil Manimohan and then reclassified again in 2012 as Leucocoprinus viridiflavus by Erhard Ludwig.

== Description ==
Leucocoprinus viridiflavus is a small dapperling mushroom with thin yellow flesh (up to 4mm thick at the central disc) that discolours olive or green when damaged or cut.

Petch described Lepiota viridiflava as follows:

Cap: Up to 2.5 cm wide, umbonate and almost planar when expanded. The surface colour is greenish-yellow or sulphur-yellow and is coated in thin dark green patches and specks which may appear sticky when moist or shiny when dry. The central disc or umbo is a darker green than the rest of the surface. As opposed to most Leucocoprinus species which display striations at the cap edges this species is said to have an appendiculate margin, with pieces of the partial veil hanging from the cap edges. Stem: 2.5–3 cm tall and 3mm thick tapering upwards from a slightly wider base. The surface is greenish-yellow or sulphur-yellow similar to the cap and is fibrillose with dark green fibers towards the base. The interior is hollow with white fibers and yellow flesh. Gills: Free, crowded and likewise greenish-yellow or sulphur-yellow with green bruising. Spores: Ovoid and pale yellow. 5-8 x 3-4 μm.

The 2009 description of Leucoagaricus viridiflavus is similar but expands on these details:

Cap: 1.1-2.9 cm wide, conical or convex when young expanding to convex or applanate when mature. Broadly umbonate with a pastel yellow surface that is smooth or rarely has minute fibrils which are olive or the same colour as the cap surface. All parts discolour to olive and finally dark grey with bruising. The cap edges do not have striations and are incurved when young, becoming straight with age sometimes with veil fragments present. Stem: 4–7 cm tall and 2-4mm thick with a slightly bulbous base that is up to 6mm wide from which the stem may taper up from slightly or be otherwise equal in width across the length. The surface is pastel yellow and smooth but with fibers towards the base whilst the interior is solid at first but hollowing with age. The membranous stem ring is located towards the top of the step (superior) but may disappear. Gills: Free, crowded or moderately crowded and up to 4mm wide. Pastel yellow to greenish yellow with some fringing on the edges that is more noticeable with age and when viewed with a lens. Smell: Not distinctive. Spores: Ellipsoid to subamygdaliform with a germ pore that is not easily distinguished. Dextrinoid. 5.5-8.5 x 4-5 μm.

== Habitat and distribution ==
Leucocoprinus viridiflavus is scarcely recorded and little known. The specimens described by Petch were found on the ground in flower beds in Peradeniya, Sri Lanka whilst the specimens described by Kumar and Manimohan were found in Kerala state, India where they were scattered or solitary on soil amongst decaying Acacia leaves. It was noted as appearing regularly around the Calicut University campus immediately after heavy rains during dry periods.

== Similar species ==
There are a small number of similarly green bruising greenish-yellow species including Leucoagaricus sulphurellus, Leucocoprinus viridiflavoides, Leucoagaricus viriditinctus, Lepiota cyanescens and Leucoagaricus houaynhangensis. The genera in which they should be placed is not necessarily certain and some of these species may still be known under previous classifications within Lepiota, Leucocoprinus or Leucoagaricus or may be subject to reclassification as some of these species are poorly documented and all are scarcely observed. As the macroscopic characteristics of these species are similar and unusual within these genera it may take microscopic analysis to distinguish them.
