= Leucocoprinus amanitoides =

Scientific classification
- Kingdom: Fungi
- Division: Basidiomycota
- Class: Agaricomycetes
- Order: Agaricales
- Family: Agaricaceae
- Genus: Leucocoprinus
- Species: L. amanitoides

Binomial name
- Leucocoprinus amanitoides (R.M. Davis & Vellinga) Kun L. Yang, Jia Y. Lin & Zhu L. Yang (2024)

Synonyms
- Leucoagaricus amanitoides R.M. Davis & Vellinga(2006)

Species of fungus

Leucocoprinus amanitoides is a species of mushroom producing fungus in the family Agaricaceae. It can be found in Central California. It is unusual amongst Leucocoprinus species as it has a volva.

== Taxonomy ==
The species was described as Leucoagaricus amanitoides in 2006 by the mycologists R.M. Davis & Else Vellinga.

In 2024 the species was reclassified as Leucocoprinus amanitoides by the Chinese mycologists Kun L. Yang, Jia Y. Lin & Zhu L. Yang.
