= Leucocoprinus zeylanicus =

Scientific classification
- Kingdom: Fungi
- Division: Basidiomycota
- Class: Agaricomycetes
- Order: Agaricales
- Family: Agaricaceae
- Genus: Leucocoprinus
- Species: L. zeylanicus

Binomial name
- Leucocoprinus zeylanicus (Berk) Boedijn (1940)

Synonyms
- Agaricus zeylanicus Berk (1847); Mastocephalus zeylanicus Kuntze (1891)

Species of fungus

Leucocoprinus zeylanicus
- Mycological characteristics
- Gills on hymenium
- Cap is campanulate or umbonate
- Hymenium is free
- Stipe has a ring
- Spore print is white
- Ecology is saprotrophic
- Edibility is unknown

Leucocoprinus zeylanicus is a species of mushroom producing fungus in the family Agaricaceae.

== Taxonomy ==
It was first described in 1847 by the British mycologist Miles Joseph Berkeley who classified it as Agaricus zeylanicus.

In 1891 it was classified as Mastocephalus zeylanicus by the German botanist Otto Kunze, however Kunze's Mastocephalus genus, along with most of 'Revisio generum plantarum' was not widely accepted by the scientific community of the age so it remained an Agaricus.

In 1940 it was reclassified as Leucocoprinus zeylanicus by the Dutch mycologist Karel Bernard Boedijn.

== Description ==
Leucocoprinus zeylanicus is a small dapperling mushroom.

Cap: Around 8 cm wide. Campanulate (bell shaped) with an umbo in the centre and striations at the edges. Gills: Free. Stem: Smooth with a narrow stem ring. Spores: 7.5-9x4.5-6.5 μm.

== Habitat and distribution ==
L. zeylanicus is scarcely recorded and little known however it is reported to be a very common species in the Western Ghats ranges of India. In 2003 a mushroom survey conducted at the Tropical Botanic Garden and Research Institute, in Kerala state, India observed this species growing on the campus. It was found scattered or in groups on the forest floor and in flower beds in the garden which had been well fertilised with manure as well as on cow dung itself and occasionally on the bark of living trees.

Berkeley described the mushroom from a garden in Peradeniya, Sri Lanka (then known as Ceylon) in 1844. Many of his observations were conducted in this area so it is possible that they were in or around the vicinity of the Royal Botanical Gardens, Peradeniya, which were founded in 1843.
