= Leucoagaricus croceus =

Scientific classification
- Kingdom: Fungi
- Division: Basidiomycota
- Class: Agaricomycetes
- Order: Agaricales
- Family: Agaricaceae
- Genus: Leucoagaricus
- Species: L. croceus

Binomial name
- Leucoagaricus croceus S.M. Tang & K.D. Hyde (2022)

Species of fungus

Leucoagaricus croceus Mycological characteristics
- Gills on hymenium
- Cap is convex or flat
- Hymenium is free
- Stipe has a ring
- Spore print is white
- Ecology is saprotrophic
- Edibility is unknown

Leucoagaricus croceus is a species of mushroom-producing fungus in the family Agaricaceae.

== Taxonomy ==
It was described in 2022 by the mycologists S.M. Tang and Kevin D. Hyde who classified it as Leucoagaricus croceus.

== Description ==
Leucoagaricus croceus is a small dapperling mushroom with a reddish orange cap and white stem and flesh.

Cap: 3-6cm wide, starting bulbous before becoming subumbonate and expanding to plano-convex with an obtuse umbo. The surface is reddish-orange when immature but fades towards the cap edges as it expands until it has a reddish-orange centre with a pale, pastel red colour spreading across the surface to the white margins. It has floccose to pulverent scales across the immature cap but becomes smooth with age. The cap may split to reveal the white, unchanging flesh within. Gills: Free, crowded and white. Stem: 3-5cm long and 3-5mm thick tapering upwards from the bulbous 8-12mm thick base. The surface is cream to white with unchanging white flesh inside. The membranous stem ring is white and located towards or above the middle of the stem (median to superior). Spores: (3.5) 4.1–7.2 (7.9) x (2.4) 2.6–4.4 (4.6) μm. Ovoid to ellipsoidal, smooth with a thin wall. Hyaline. Basidia: 15-20 x 9-10 μm. Clavate, 4 spored.

== Etymology ==
The specific epithet croceus is named in reference to the reddish orange cap colour.

== Habitat and distribution ==
The species is known from Thailand and China where it grows on soil.
