= Cyparium newtoni =

Scientific classification
- Kingdom: Animalia
- Phylum: Arthropoda
- Class: Insecta
- Order: Coleoptera
- Suborder: Polyphaga
- Infraorder: Staphyliniformia
- Family: Staphylinidae
- Genus: Cyparium
- Species: C. newtoni

Binomial name
- Cyparium newtoni Groll & Lopes-Andrade, 2022

Species of beetle

Cyparium newtoni is a species of beetle of the family Staphylinidae. This species is found in south-eastern Brazil (Minas Gerais).

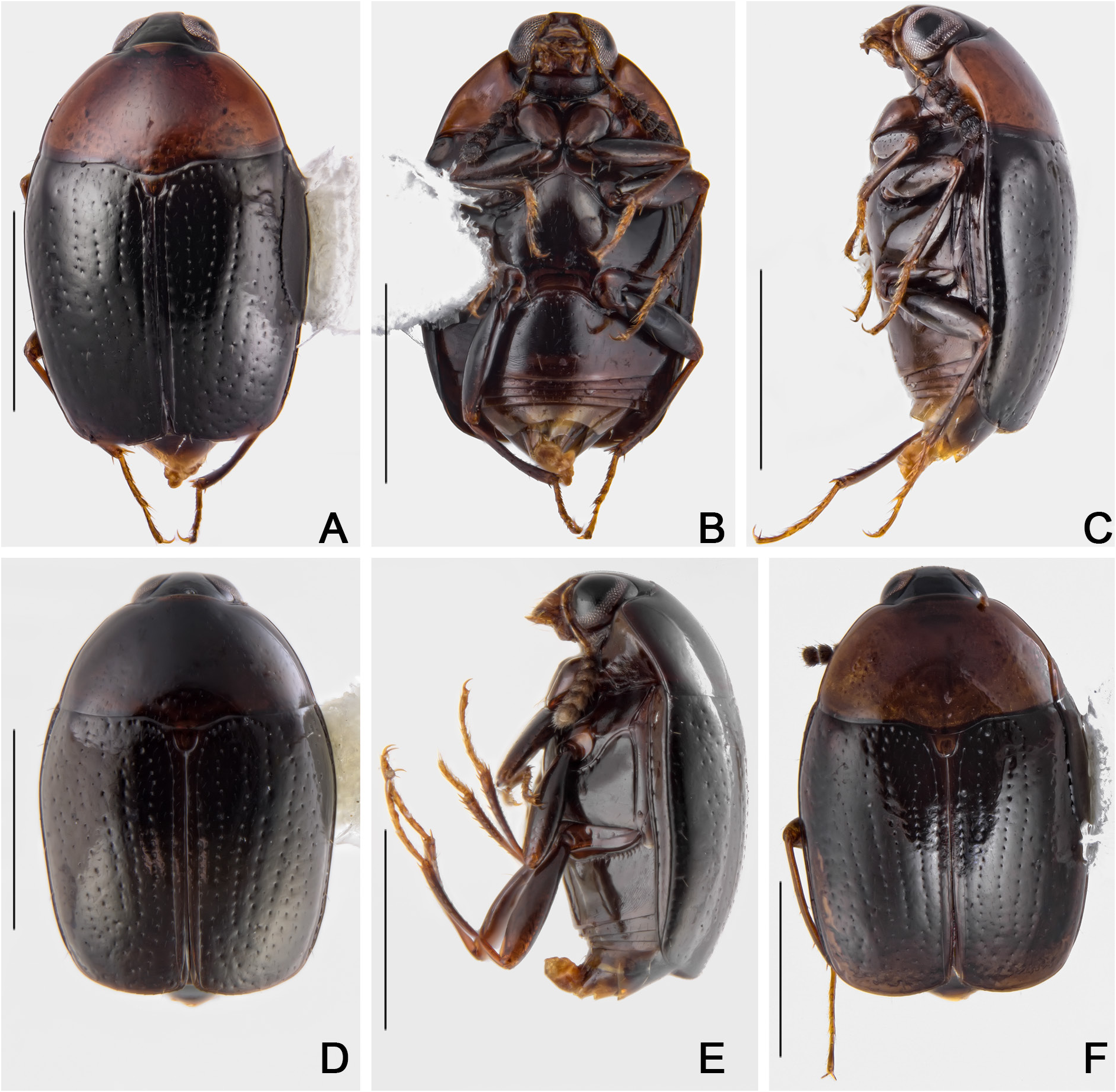
Cyparium newtoni sp. nov. A–C. Holotype, ♂ (CELC). A. Dorsal view. B. Ventral view. C. Lateral view. D–E. Paratype, unknown sex (CELC). D. Dorsal view. E. Lateral view. F. Paratype, ♀ (CELC), dorsal view. Specimens collected at Mata do Paraíso (A–C) and Mata da Biologia (D–F), Viçosa (MG, Brazil). Scale bars = 1.0 mm.

== Description ==
Adults reach a length of about 2–2.22 mm (males) and 2–2.30 mm (females). The pronotum is reddish brown and the elytra are black.

== Life history ==
Adults were collected from Psathyrella candolleana, Agaricus dulcidulus, Agaricus sylvaticus and Entoloma species.

== Etymology ==
The species is named in honour of Dr Alfred F. Newton (Field Museum, Chicago, USA) for his significant contribution to the systematics of Staphylinidae and more specifically of Scaphidiinae.
