= Cyparium lescheni =

Scientific classification
- Kingdom: Animalia
- Phylum: Arthropoda
- Class: Insecta
- Order: Coleoptera
- Suborder: Polyphaga
- Infraorder: Staphyliniformia
- Family: Staphylinidae
- Genus: Cyparium
- Species: C. lescheni

Binomial name
- Cyparium lescheni Groll & Lopes-Andrade, 2022

Species of beetle

Cyparium lescheni is a species of beetle of the family Staphylinidae. This species is found in south-eastern Brazil (Minas Gerais).

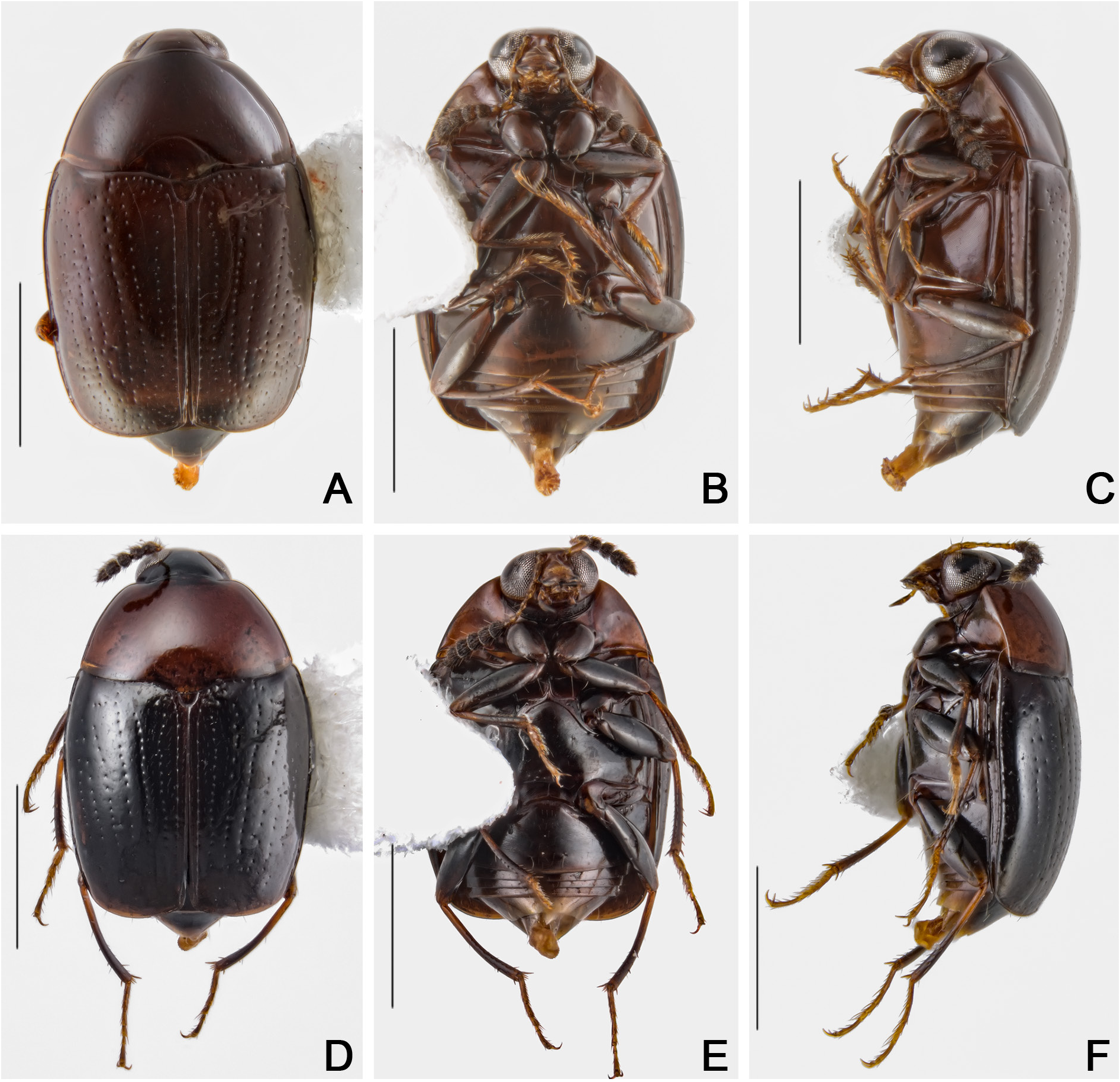
Cyparium lescheni sp. nov. A–C. Holotype, ♂ (CELC). D–F. Paratype, ♂ (CELC). A. Dorsal view. B. Ventral view. C. Lateral view. D. Dorsal view. E. Ventral view. F. Lateral view. Specimens collected at Mata do Paraíso, Viçosa (MG, Brazil). Scale bars = 1.0 mm.

== Description ==
Adults reach a length of about 2.07–2.25 mm (males) and 2.10–2.35 mm (females). They are brown, with antennomeres I–VI, clypeus, mouthparts and tarsi yellow.

== Life history ==
Adults were collected from Psathyrella candolleana, Agaricus dulcidulus, Agaricus sylvaticus and Entoloma species.

== Etymology ==
The species is named in honour of Dr Richard A.B. Leschen (New Zealand Arthropod Collection) for his great contributions to the systematics of Coleoptera, especially regarding Scaphidiinae.
