= Cyparium loebli =

Scientific classification
- Kingdom: Animalia
- Phylum: Arthropoda
- Class: Insecta
- Order: Coleoptera
- Suborder: Polyphaga
- Infraorder: Staphyliniformia
- Family: Staphylinidae
- Genus: Cyparium
- Species: C. loebli

Binomial name
- Cyparium loebli Groll & Lopes-Andrade, 2022

Species of beetle

Cyparium loebli is a species of beetle of the family Staphylinidae. This species is found in south-eastern Brazil (Minas Gerais).

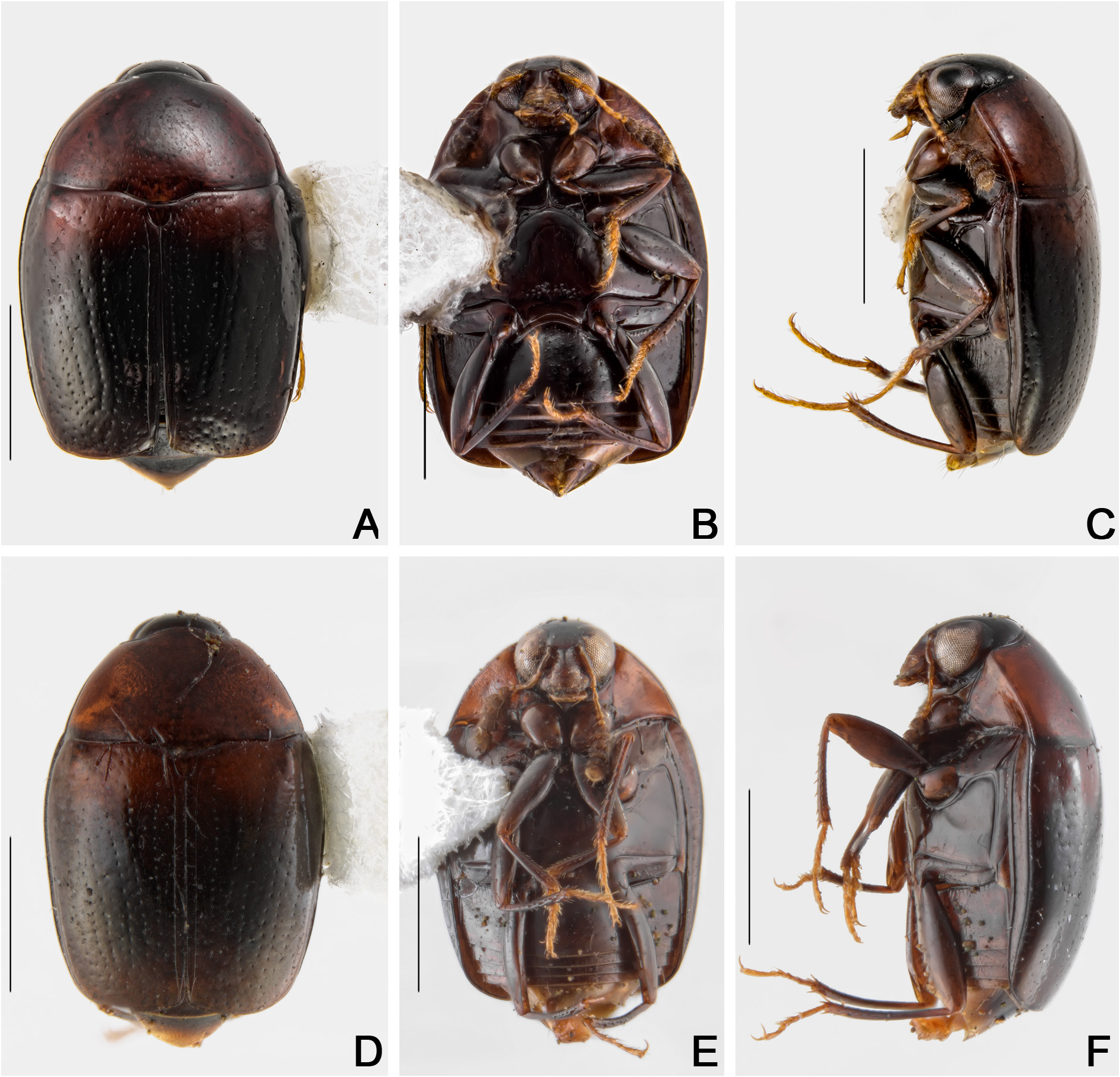
Cyparium loebli sp. nov. A–C. Holotype, ♂ (CELC). A. Dorsal view. B. Ventral view. C. Lateral view. D–F. Paratype, ♂ (CELC). D. Dorsal view. E. Ventral view. F. Lateral view. Specimens collected at Mata do Paraíso, Viçosa (MG, Brazil). Scale bars = 1.0 mm.

== Description ==
Adults reach a length of about 2.53–2.78 mm (males) and 2.34–2.68 mm (females). The pronotum, hypomeron and scutellum are reddish brown, while the elytra are black, with the anterior region reddish brown.

== Life history ==
Adults were collected from Psathyrella candolleana, Xylodon flaviporus and Agaricus sylvaticus.

== Etymology ==
The species is named in honour of Dr Ivan Löbl (Muséum d'histoire naturelle, Genève, CH), for his remarkable contributions to the systematics of Scaphidiinae.
