= Cyparium oberthueri =

Scientific classification
- Kingdom: Animalia
- Phylum: Arthropoda
- Class: Insecta
- Order: Coleoptera
- Suborder: Polyphaga
- Infraorder: Staphyliniformia
- Family: Staphylinidae
- Genus: Cyparium
- Species: C. oberthueri

Binomial name
- Cyparium oberthueri Pic, 1956

Species of beetle

Cyparium oberthueri is a species of beetle of the family Staphylinidae. This species is found in south-eastern Brazil (Matto Grosso, Minas Gerais).

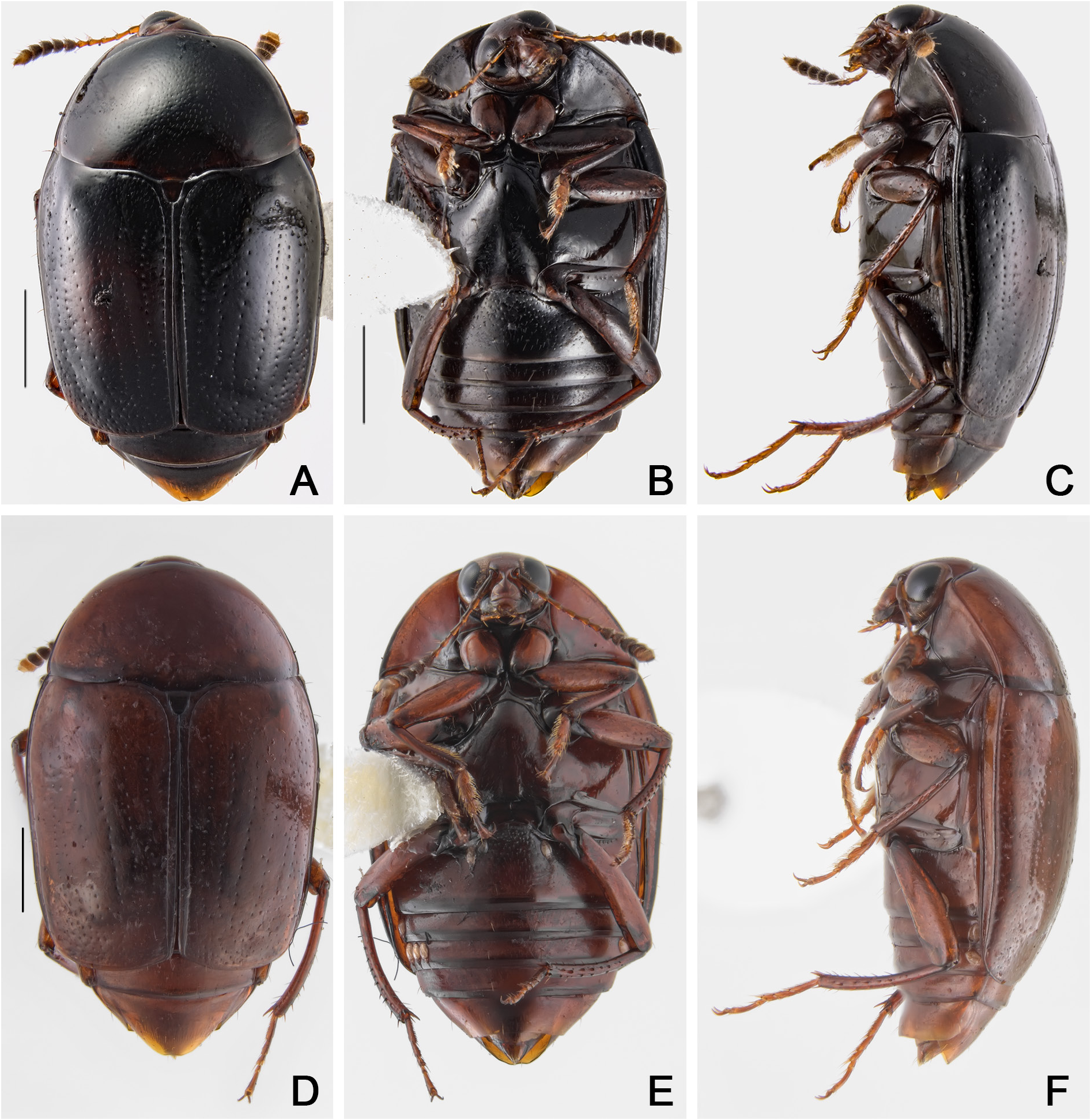
Cyparium oberthueri Pic, 1956. A–C. Male specimen (CELC). A. Dorsal view. B. Ventral view. C. Lateral view. D–F. Different male specimen (CELC). D. Dorsal view. E. Ventral view. F. Lateral view. Specimens collected at Mata da Biologia (A–C) and Mata do Paraíso (D–F). Scale bars = 1.0 mm

== Description ==
Adults reach a length of about 4.43–5.12 mm (males) and 4.68–5.25 mm (females). They are black, with the scutellum tapered posteriorly.

== Life history ==
Adults were collected from Psathyrella candolleana.
