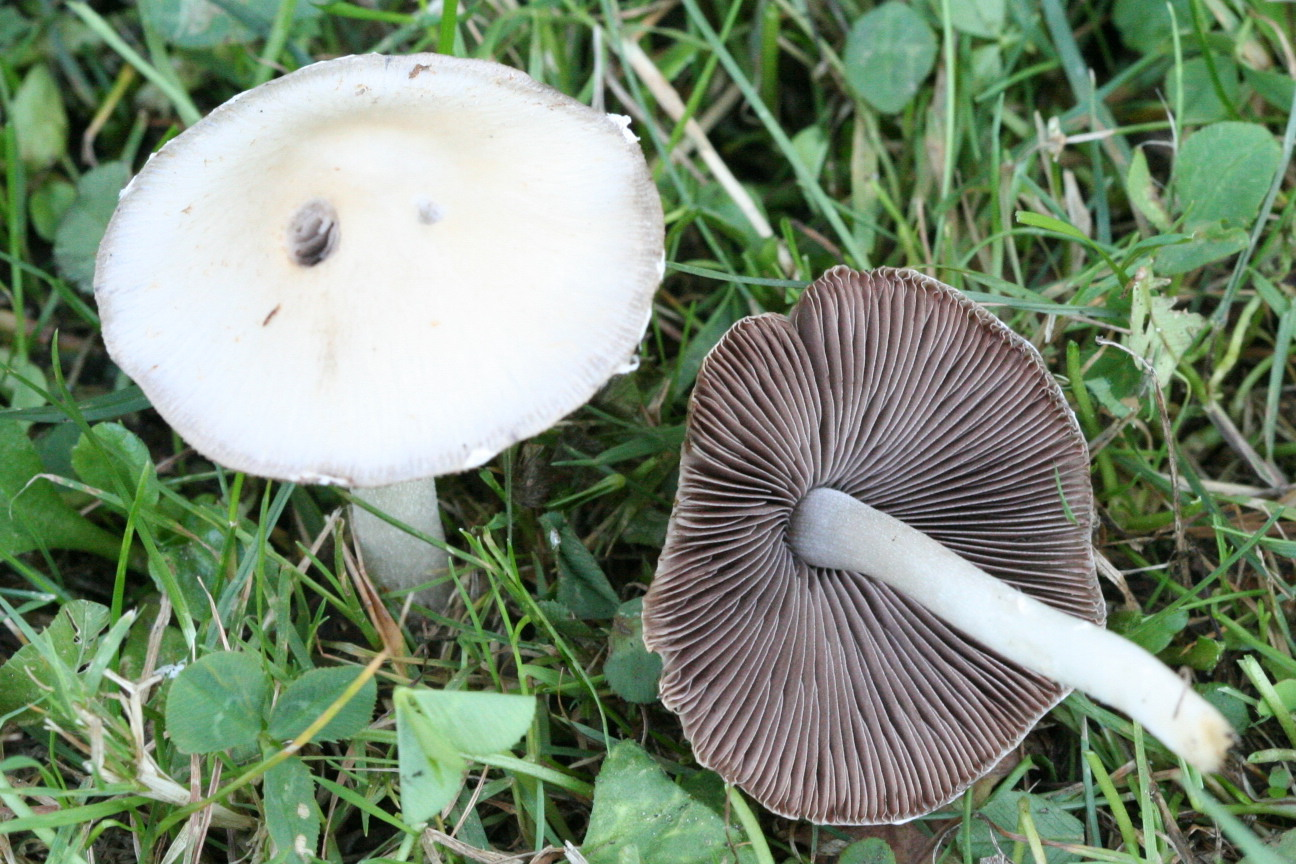
- Candolleomyces candolleanus

Scientific classification
- Kingdom: Fungi
- Division: Basidiomycota
- Class: Agaricomycetes
- Order: Agaricales
- Family: Psathyrellaceae
- Genus: Candolleomyces; D. Wächt & A. Melzer (2020)

Type species
- Candolleomyces candolleanus (Fr.) D. Wächt & A. Melzer (2020)

= Candolleomyces =

Genus of fungi

Candolleomyces is a genus of fungi in the family Psathyrellaceae.

== Taxonomy ==
The Candolleomyces genus was created in 2020 by the German mycologists Dieter Wächter & Andreas Melzer when the Psathyrellaceae family was subdivided based on phylogenetic analysis. Many members of the Psathyrella genus were reclassified as Candolleomyces.

The type species, Candolleomyces candolleanus was previously classified as Psathyrella candolleana.

== Etymology ==
The genus is named after the specific epithet of the type species.

== Species ==
As of October 2022, Species Fungorum accepted 25 species of Candolleomyces.

1. Candolleomyces aberdarensis
2. Candolleomyces albipes
3. Candolleomyces albosquamosus
4. Candolleomyces badhyzensis
5. Candolleomyces badiophyllus
6. Candolleomyces bivelatus
7. Candolleomyces cacao
8. Candolleomyces caespitosus
9. Candolleomyces candolleanus
10. Candolleomyces efflorescens
11. Candolleomyces fimicola
12. Candolleomyces floccosus
13. Candolleomyces graminus
14. Candolleomyces halophilus
15. Candolleomyces leucotephrus
16. Candolleomyces luteopallidus
17. Candolleomyces paecilospermus
18. Candolleomyces pseudocandolleanus
19. Candolleomyces rupchandii
20. Candolleomyces secotioides
21. Candolleomyces singeri
22. Candolleomyces subsingeri
23. Candolleomyces sulcatotuberculosus
24. Candolleomyces trinitatensis
25. Candolleomyces tuberculatus
26. Candolleomyces typhae
