= Nicrophorus quadricollis =

Nicrophorus quadricollis may refer to:

- Nicrophorus quadraticollis, misidentified in 1928 by Hatch
- Nicrophorus olidus, misidentified in 1848 by Gistel
