= Cyparium achardi =

Scientific classification
- Kingdom: Animalia
- Phylum: Arthropoda
- Class: Insecta
- Order: Coleoptera
- Suborder: Polyphaga
- Infraorder: Staphyliniformia
- Family: Staphylinidae
- Genus: Cyparium
- Species: C. achardi

Binomial name
- Cyparium achardi Groll & Lopes-Andrade, 2022

Species of beetle

Cyparium achardi is a species of beetle of the family Staphylinidae. This species is found in south-eastern Brazil (Minas Gerais).

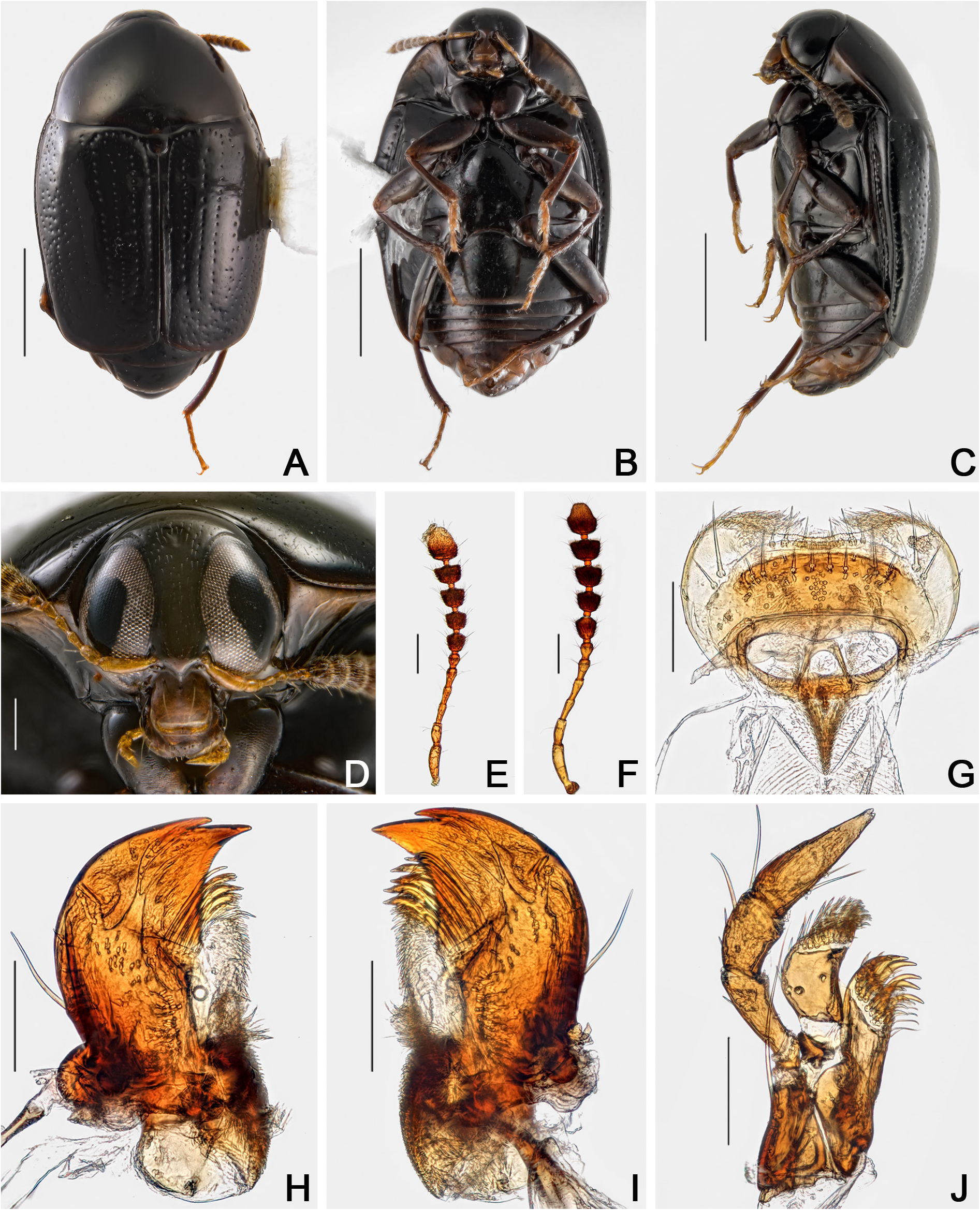
Cyparium achardi sp. nov. A–D. Holotype, ♂ (CELC). A. Dorsal view. B. Ventral view. C. Lateral view. D. Frontal view. E–F. Antennae, paratype, ♂ (CELC) (E) and paratype, ♀ (CELC) (F). G–J. Paratype, ♂ (CELC). G. Labrum. H–I. Mandible. H. Left. I. Right. J. Maxilla. Specimens collected at Mata do Paraíso, Viçosa (MG, Brazil). Scale bars: A–C = 1.0 mm; D–F = 0.2 mm; G–J = 0.1.

== Description ==
Adults reach a length of about 3–3.28 mm (males) and 3.32–3.40 mm (females). They are entirely black, with the lateral areas of some ventral sclerites lighter.

== Life history ==
Adults were collected from Marasmiellus volvatus, Marasmius haematocephalus, Leucocoprinus ianthinus, Leucocoprinus cepistipes, Hygrocybe and Leucoagaricus species.

== Etymology ==
The species is named in honour of Julien Achard (1881–1925) for his significant contribution on the Neotropical Scaphidiinae.
