= Cyparium collare =

Scientific classification
- Kingdom: Animalia
- Phylum: Arthropoda
- Class: Insecta
- Order: Coleoptera
- Suborder: Polyphaga
- Infraorder: Staphyliniformia
- Family: Staphylinidae
- Genus: Cyparium
- Species: C. collare

Binomial name
- Cyparium collare Pic, 1920

Species of beetle

Cyparium collare is a species of beetle of the family Staphylinidae. This species is found in south-eastern Brazil (Matto Grosso, Sergipe, Minas Gerais).

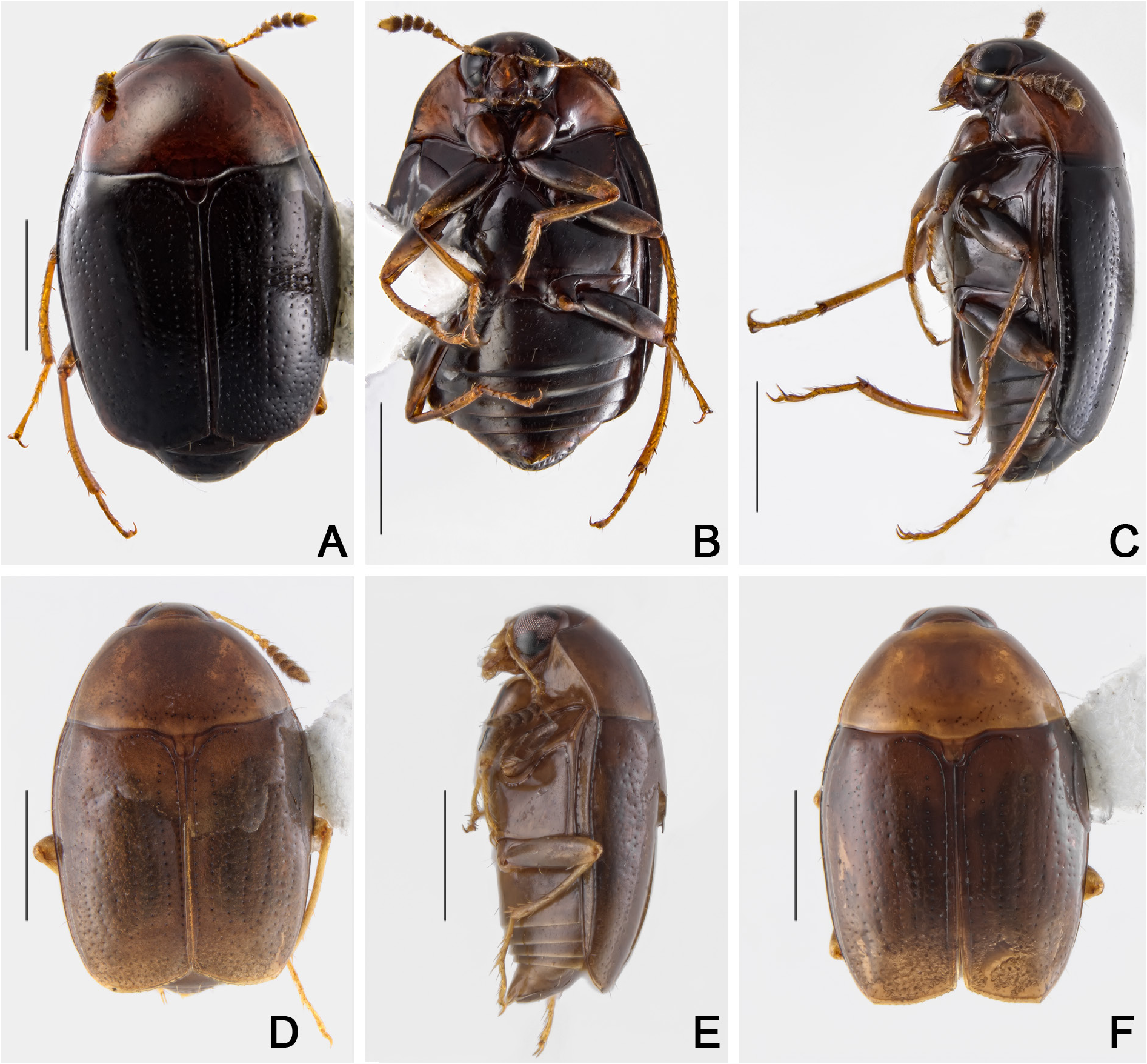
Cyparium collare Pic, 1920. A–C. ♂ (CELC). A. Dorsal view. B. Ventral view. C. Lateral view. D–F. ♀ (CELC). D. Dorsal view. E. Lateral view. F. Dorsal view. Specimens collected at Mata do Paraíso (A–C) and Mata da Biologia (D–F), Viçosa (MG, Brazil). Scale bars = 1.0 mm.

== Description ==
Adults reach a length of about 2.60–3.40 mm (males) and 2.56–3.52 mm (females). The pronotum is reddish brown and the elytra are black.

== Life history ==
Adults were collected from various Marasmiellus species (including Marasmiellus cubensis), Leucoprinus species (including Leucocoprinus cepistipes and Leucocoprinus ianthinus), Inocybe, Volvariella, Lepiota, Pluteus, Mycena, Entoloma and Conocybe species, as well as Leucoagaricus rubrotinctus, Macrolepiota colombiana, Heimiomyces neovelutipes, Lulesia lignicola, Pleurotus pulmonarius, Coprinellus disseminatus and Favolus tenuiculus.
