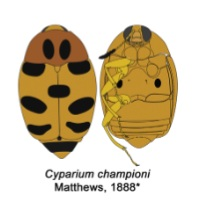

Scientific classification
- Kingdom: Animalia
- Phylum: Arthropoda
- Class: Insecta
- Order: Coleoptera
- Suborder: Polyphaga
- Infraorder: Staphyliniformia
- Family: Staphylinidae
- Genus: Cyparium
- Species: C. championi

Binomial name
- Cyparium championi Matthews, 1888

= Cyparium championi =

Species of beetle

Cyparium championi is a species of beetle of the family Staphylinidae. This species is found in Bolivia, Costa Rica, Ecuador, Nicaragua, Panama and Suriname.
