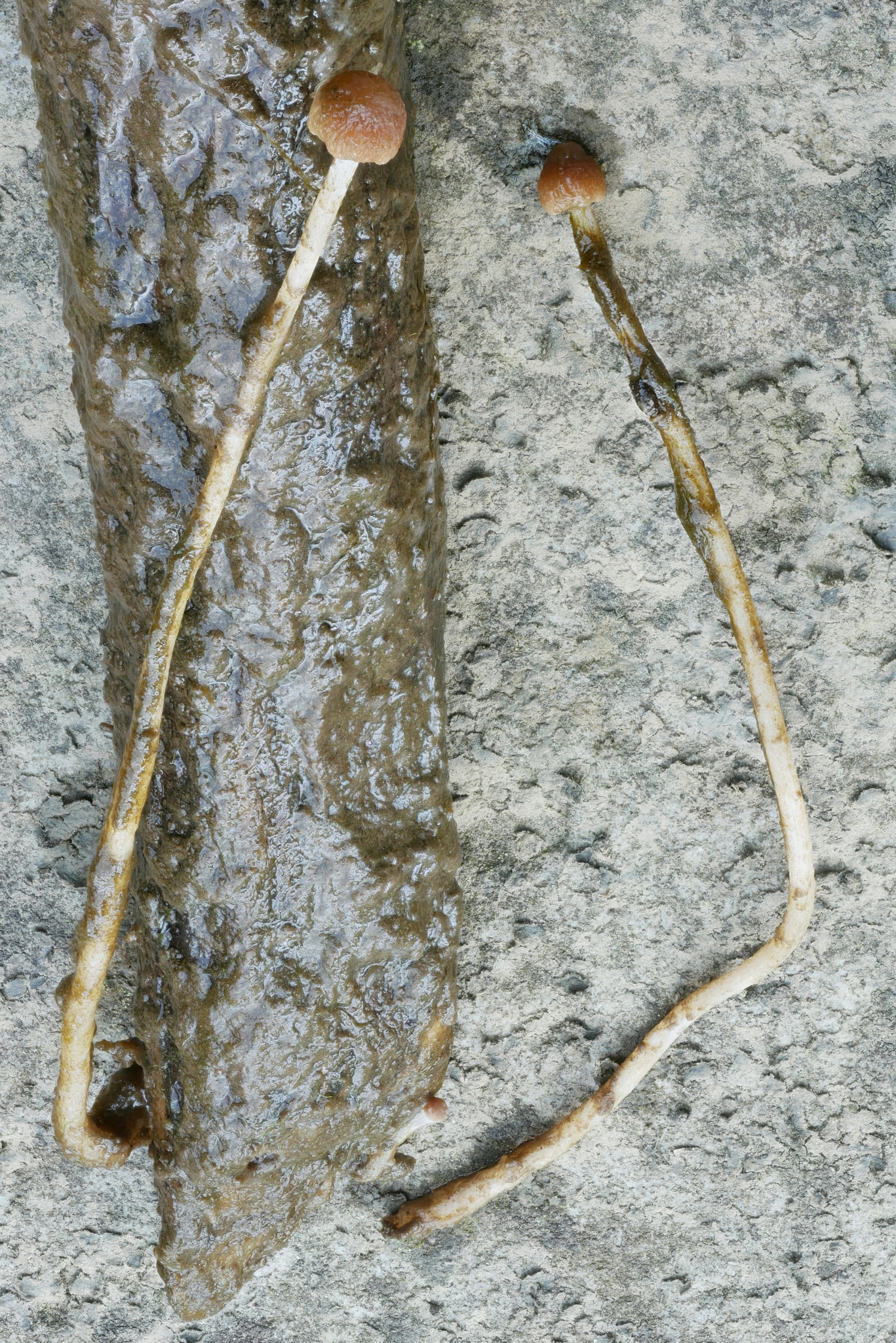

Conservation status
- Critically Imperiled (NatureServe)

Scientific classification
- Kingdom: Fungi
- Division: Basidiomycota
- Class: Agaricomycetes
- Order: Agaricales
- Family: Psathyrellaceae
- Genus: Psathyrella
- Species: P. aquatica

Binomial name
- Psathyrella aquatica J.L.Frank, Coffan, & Southworth (2010)

= Psathyrella aquatica =

Species of fungus

Psathyrella aquatica
- Mycological characteristics
- Gills on hymenium
- Cap is convex
- Hymenium is free
- Stipe is bare
- Spore print is blackish-brown
- Ecology is saprotrophic
- Edibility is unknown

Psathyrella aquatica, commonly known as the aquatic gilled mushroom, is a species of fungus from Oregon, first described in the journal Mycologia in 2010. It represents the first ever report of a gilled basidiomycete fruiting underwater.

== Taxonomy ==
=== Discovery ===
It was found by Southern Oregon University professor Robert Coffan in the Rogue River in the U.S. state of Oregon. Coffan and his colleagues, Darlene Southworth and Jonathan Frank, found the mushroom in 2005. The biology department at Southern Oregon University confirmed that the mushroom was a unique discovery. Once their research was published, it was named one of the most significant species discovered in 2010. The species epithet, aquatica, is a Latin word meaning water or watery (relating to water, aquatic), in reference to the mushroom's habitat.

They have so far been discovered in a 1 kilometer stretch of the river, and have an observed fruiting season of mid-June to late September Many scientists were skeptical about describing this mushroom as a new species because of the hundreds of similar looking species in the family Psathyrellaceae.

Less than 1% of aquatic fungi are assumed to be discovered yet, and many are assumed to be microscopic, with only a small fraction thought to produce fruiting bodies.

== Description ==
The fruiting body consists of a small convex cap and a long stipe. Its cap is brown, convex, and has gills underneath. The young mushroom develops a veil, which is lost as the mushroom grows to maturity. The mushroom's stipe appears to be quite strong, and is anchored up to 1.6 feet (0.5 m) deep in sediment, in order to stand up to the fast-moving river currents where it is primarily found. The stipe is covered in thin hair like structures. Spores released by the gills stay in gas bubbles underneath the gills before floating to the top of the water to spread. Underwater gills and ballistospores suggest that its underwater adaption is a relatively recent one.

When synthetically grown, P. aquatica are known to only fruit (produce stipe and cap) underwater. A study done in 2014 by one of the original authors of the discovery paper showed that this species only produces sporocarps when completely submerged under cold water.

== Habitat ==
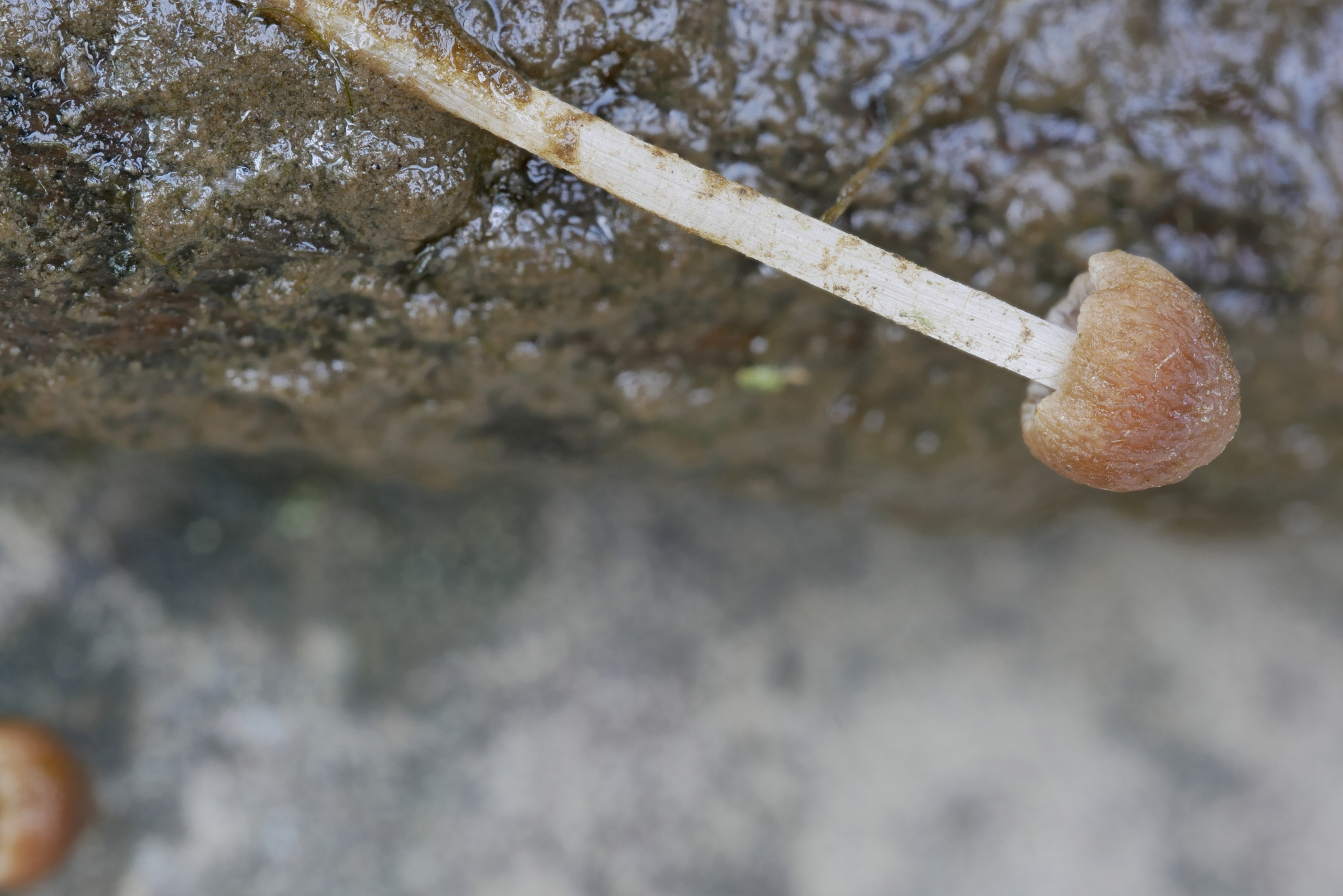

The mushrooms are found growing out of water-logged wood, silt, and gravel, a fine volcanic substrate, and were observed growing from youth to maturity completely underwater over 11 weeks. The mushroom grows submerged under the fast, cold, running water of the river. The water is spring-fed, aerated, and contains lots of woody debris and is shallow in depth. They are found growing about half a meter underneath the water. The mushroom is also found growing on land on either grassy banks or on gravel or water-logged wood next to the river.

== Ecology ==
Though not enough is known about the species to consider it edible, scientist assume that it is a food source for small insects in the river. Though the river has low levels of nitrogen, nitrogen-fixing cyanobacteria near mushroom discovery sites suggests they might provide a source of nitrogen.
