= Cyparium flavosignatum =

Scientific classification
- Kingdom: Animalia
- Phylum: Arthropoda
- Class: Insecta
- Order: Coleoptera
- Suborder: Polyphaga
- Infraorder: Staphyliniformia
- Family: Staphylinidae
- Genus: Cyparium
- Species: C. flavosignatum

Binomial name
- Cyparium flavosignatum Zayas, 1988

Species of beetle

Cyparium flavosignatum is a species of beetle of the family Staphylinidae. This species is found in Cuba.

== Subspecies ==
- Cyparium flavosignatum flavosignatum
- Cyparium flavosignatum bicolor Zayas, 1988
- Cyparium flavosignatum funebre Zayas, 1988
- Cyparium flavosignatum splendidum Zayas, 1988
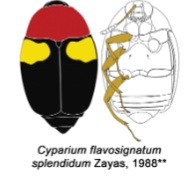
Cyparium flavosignatum splendidum

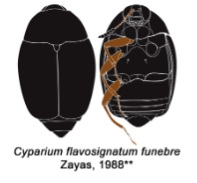
Cyparium flavosignatum funebre

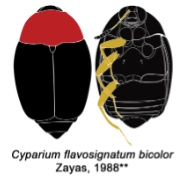
Cyparium flavosignatum bicolor

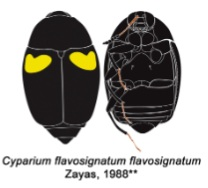
Cyparium flavosignatum flavosignatum
