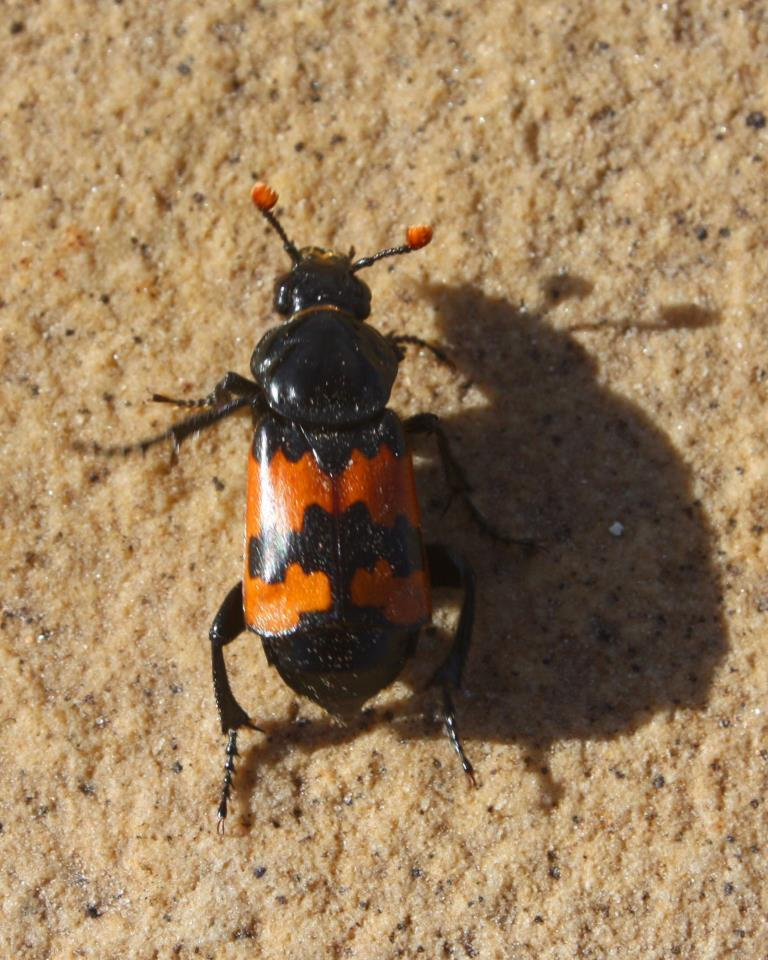

Scientific classification
- Kingdom: Animalia
- Phylum: Arthropoda
- Class: Insecta
- Order: Coleoptera
- Suborder: Polyphaga
- Infraorder: Staphyliniformia
- Family: Staphylinidae
- Genus: Nicrophorus
- Species: N. marginatus

Binomial name
- Nicrophorus marginatus Fabricius, 1801

Synonyms
- List: Nicrophorus vespillo v. "beta" Frölich, 1792 (Unav.); Necrophorus [sic] marginatus Fabricius, 1801; Necrophorus [sic] lunulatus Gistel, 1848; Necrophorus [sic] lunatus Gistel, 1857; Necrophorus [sic] montezumae Matthews, 1888; Nicrophorus mckittricki Pierce, 1949; Nicrophorus obtusisculletum Pierce, 1949; Nicrophorus guttulus labreae Pierce, 1949; Nicrophorus investigator latifrons Pierce, 1949

= Nicrophorus marginatus =

Species of beetle

Nicrophorus marginatus, also known as the margined sexton beetle, margined burying beetle, or the red and black burying beetle, is a burying beetle described by Johan Christian Fabricius in 1801. Adults are 12–28 millimetres (0.47–1.10 in) in length and are shiny black with red-orange elytra bands and antennae clubs.
