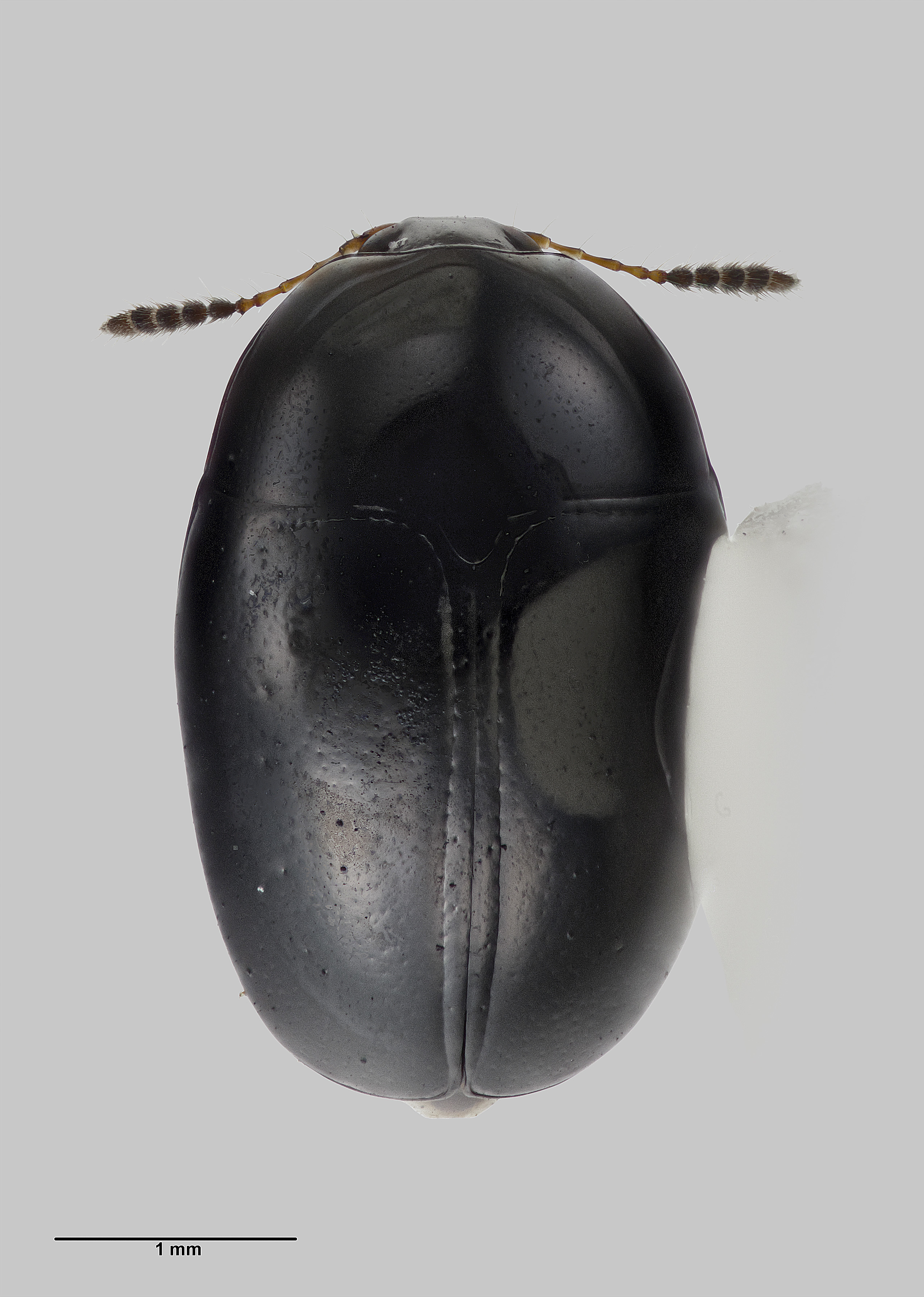
- Cyparium thorpei

Scientific classification
- Kingdom: Animalia
- Phylum: Arthropoda
- Class: Insecta
- Order: Coleoptera
- Suborder: Polyphaga
- Infraorder: Staphyliniformia
- Family: Staphylinidae
- Genus: Cyparium; Erichson, 1845

Species
- See text

Synonyms
- Yparicum Achard, 1920

= Cyparium =

Genus of beetle

Cyparium is a genus of beetles belonging to the family Staphylinidae. The genus was described by German entomologist Wilhelm Ferdinand Erichson in 1845.

== Distribution ==
The genus has a cosmopolitan distribution.

== Species ==
- Cyparium achardi Groll & Lopes-Andrade, 2022
- Cyparium anale Reitter, 1880
- Cyparium atrum Casey, 1900
- Cyparium basilewskyi Pic, 1955
- Cyparium bowringi Achard, 1922
- Cyparium celebense Ogawa & Löbl, 2016
- Cyparium championi A.Matthews, 1888
- Cyparium collare Pic, 1920
- Cyparium concolor (Fabricius, 1801)
- Cyparium earlyi Löbl & Leschen, 2003
- Cyparium ferrugineum Pic, 1920
- Cyparium flavosignatum Zayas, 1988
- Cyparium formosanum Miwa & Mitono, 1943
- Cyparium fugitivum von Groll, 2025
- Cyparium grilloi Pic, 1920
- Cyparium grouvellei Pic, 1920
- Cyparium humerale Achard, 1922
- Cyparium inclinans Kirsch, 1873
- Cyparium javanum Löbl, 1991
- Cyparium jiroi Ogawa & Sakai, 2011
- Cyparium khasianum Löbl, 1984
- Cyparium laevisternale Nakane, 1956
- Cyparium lescheni Groll & Lopes-Andrade, 2022
- Cyparium loebli Groll & Lopes-Andrade, 2022
- Cyparium mathani Oberthür, 1883
- Cyparium mikado Achard, 1923
- Cyparium minutum Pic, 1931
- Cyparium montanum Achard, 1922
- Cyparium multistriatum Pic, 1954
- Cyparium navarretei Fierros-López, 2002
- Cyparium newtoni Groll & Lopes-Andrade, 2022
- Cyparium nigronotatum Pic, 1931
- Cyparium oberthueri Pic, 1956
- Cyparium palliatum Erichson, 1845
- Cyparium pallidum Pic, 1955
- Cyparium peruvianum Pic, 1947
- Cyparium piceum Reitter, 1880
- Cyparium pici Groll & Lopes-Andrade, 2022
- Cyparium plagipenne Achard, 1922
- Cyparium punctatum Pic, 1916
- Cyparium pygidiale Achard, 1922
- Cyparium ruficolle Achard, 1922
- Cyparium rufohumerale Pic, 1931
- Cyparium rufonotatum Pic, 1916
- Cyparium sallaei A.Matthews, 1888
- Cyparium semirufum Pic, 1917
- Cyparium siamense Löbl, 1990
- Cyparium sibiricum Solsky, 1871
- Cyparium sichuanum Löbl, 1999
- Cyparium tamil Löbl, 1979
- Cyparium tenenbaumi Pic, 1926
- Cyparium terminale A.Matthews, 1888
- Cyparium testaceicorne Pic, 1931
- Cyparium testaceum Pic, 1920
- Cyparium thorpei Löbl & Leschen, 2003
- Cyparium variabile Pic, 1955
- Cyparium variegatum Achard, 1920
- Cyparium yapalli Fierros-López, 2002
- Cyparium yunnanum (Achard, 1920)
