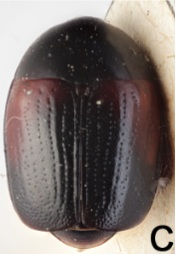

Scientific classification
- Kingdom: Animalia
- Phylum: Arthropoda
- Class: Insecta
- Order: Coleoptera
- Suborder: Polyphaga
- Infraorder: Staphyliniformia
- Family: Staphylinidae
- Genus: Cyparium
- Species: C. humerale

Binomial name
- Cyparium humerale Achard, 1922

= Cyparium humerale =

Species of beetle

Cyparium humerale is a species of beetle of the family Staphylinidae. This species is found in Bolivia.
