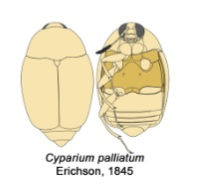

Scientific classification
- Kingdom: Animalia
- Phylum: Arthropoda
- Class: Insecta
- Order: Coleoptera
- Suborder: Polyphaga
- Infraorder: Staphyliniformia
- Family: Staphylinidae
- Genus: Cyparium
- Species: C. palliatum

Binomial name
- Cyparium palliatum Erichson, 1845

= Cyparium palliatum =

Species of beetle

Cyparium palliatum is a species of beetle of the family Staphylinidae. This species is found in Mexico.
