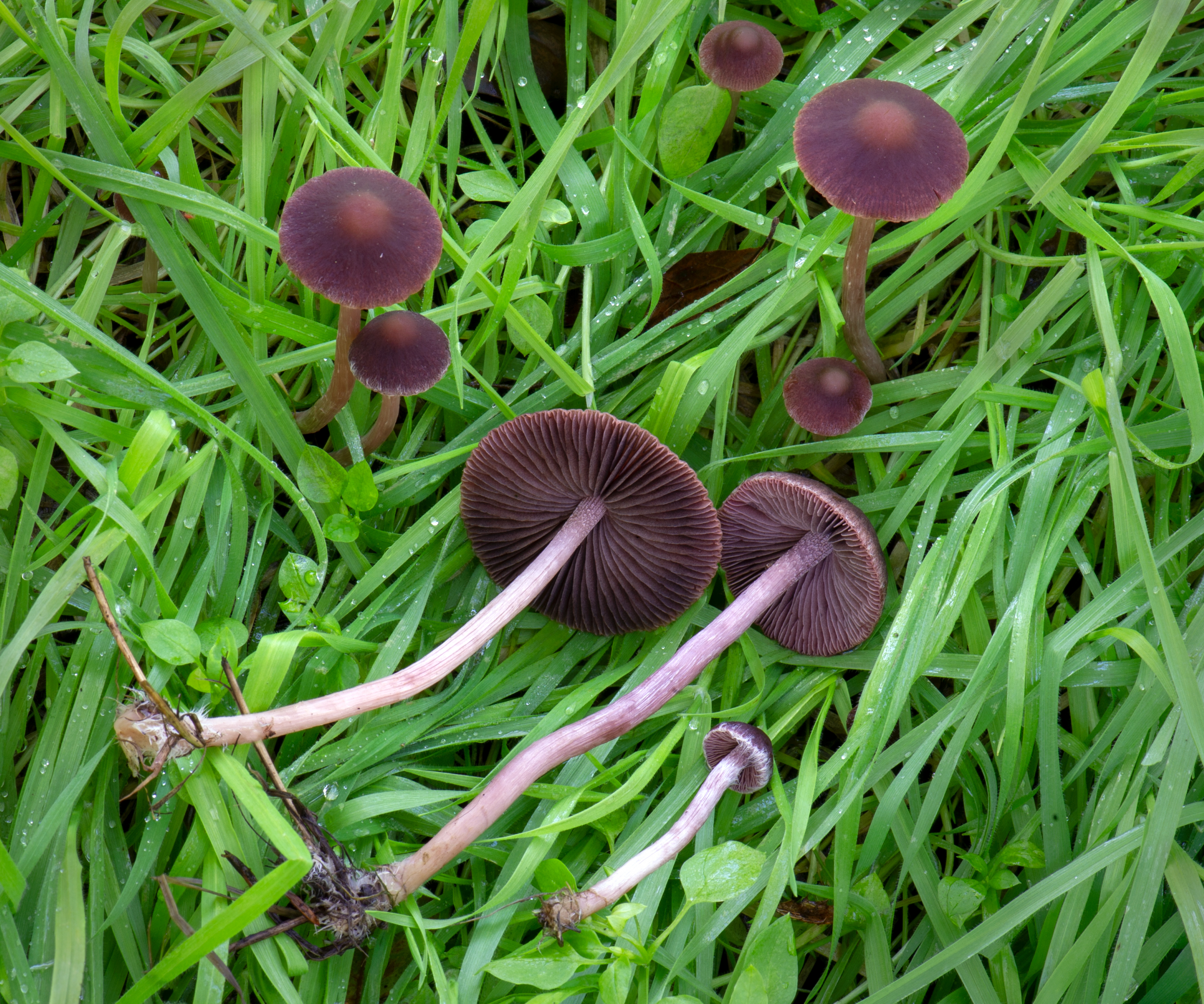

Scientific classification
- Domain: Eukaryota
- Kingdom: Fungi
- Division: Basidiomycota
- Class: Agaricomycetes
- Order: Agaricales
- Family: Psathyrellaceae
- Genus: Psathyrella
- Species: P. bipellis

Binomial name
- Psathyrella bipellis (Quél.) A.H.Sm. (1946)

Synonyms
- Psathyra barlae Bres. (1881); Psathyra bipellis Quél. (1884); Drosophila bipellis (Quél.) Quél. (1886); Pilosace barlae (Bres.) Kuntze (1898); Pilosace bipellis (Quél.) Kuntze (1898) Psathyrella barlae (Bres.) A.H.Sm. (1941)

= Psathyrella bipellis =

Species of fungus

Psathyrella bipellis is a species of mushroom in the family Psathyrellaceae.

== Taxonomy ==
The species was originally described in 1884 by French mycologist Lucien Quélet, under the name Psathyra bipellis. Alexander H. Smith transferred it to the genus Psathyrella in 1946.

== Description ==
The purplish cap is up to 4 centimetres (1 1/2 in) wide, sometimes with white flecks of veil around the margin. The narrowly adnate gills are tannish. The stem is up to 9 cm long and the spore print is purplish-black. It resembles P. subpurpurea.

== Habitat and distribution ==
It can be found in wood debris and grass in North America.
