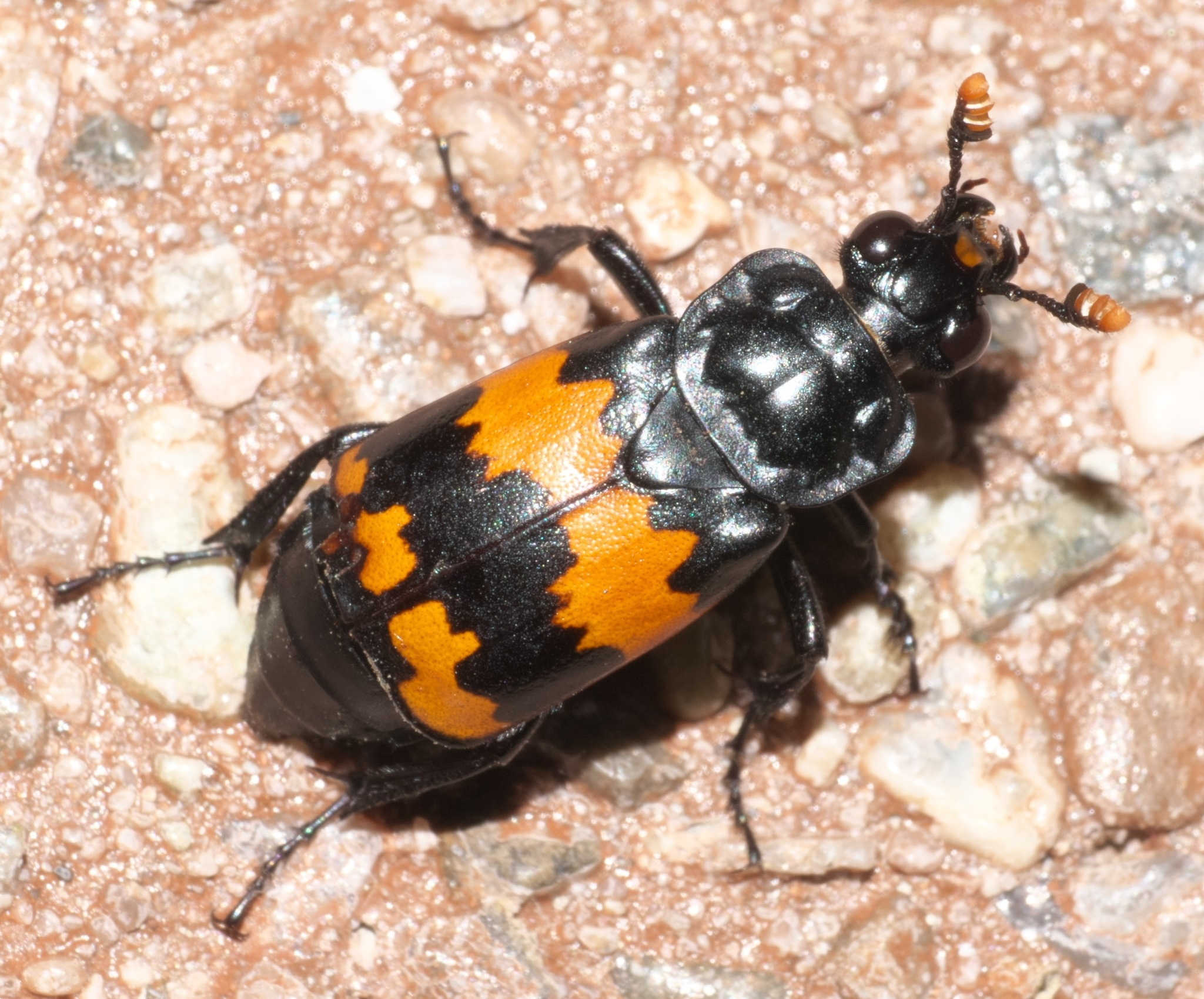
- Nicrophorus mexicanus, Wyoming

Scientific classification
- Kingdom: Animalia
- Phylum: Arthropoda
- Class: Insecta
- Order: Coleoptera
- Suborder: Polyphaga
- Infraorder: Staphyliniformia
- Family: Staphylinidae
- Genus: Nicrophorus
- Species: N. mexicanus

Binomial name
- Nicrophorus mexicanus Matthews, 1888

Synonyms
- N. investigator mexicanus, Madge, 1958

= Nicrophorus mexicanus =

Species of beetle

Nicrophorus mexicanus is a burying beetle described by Matthews in 1888.
