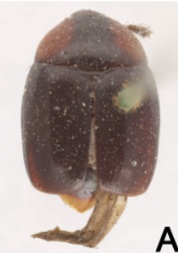

Scientific classification
- Kingdom: Animalia
- Phylum: Arthropoda
- Class: Insecta
- Order: Coleoptera
- Suborder: Polyphaga
- Infraorder: Staphyliniformia
- Family: Staphylinidae
- Genus: Cyparium
- Species: C. anale

Binomial name
- Cyparium anale Reitter, 1880

Synonyms
- Cyparium submetallicum Reitter, 1880

= Cyparium anale =

Species of beetle

Cyparium anale is a species of beetle of the family Staphylinidae. This species is found in the Dominican Republic.
