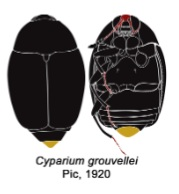

Scientific classification
- Kingdom: Animalia
- Phylum: Arthropoda
- Class: Insecta
- Order: Coleoptera
- Suborder: Polyphaga
- Infraorder: Staphyliniformia
- Family: Staphylinidae
- Genus: Cyparium
- Species: C. grouvellei

Binomial name
- Cyparium grouvellei Pic, 1920

= Cyparium grouvellei =

Species of beetle

Cyparium grouvellei is a species of beetle of the family Staphylinidae. This species is found in Brazil.
