= Cyparium pici =

Scientific classification
- Kingdom: Animalia
- Phylum: Arthropoda
- Class: Insecta
- Order: Coleoptera
- Suborder: Polyphaga
- Infraorder: Staphyliniformia
- Family: Staphylinidae
- Genus: Cyparium
- Species: C. pici

Binomial name
- Cyparium pici Groll & Lopes-Andrade, 2022

Species of beetle

Cyparium pici is a species of beetle of the family Staphylinidae. This species is found in south-eastern Brazil (Mato Grosso).

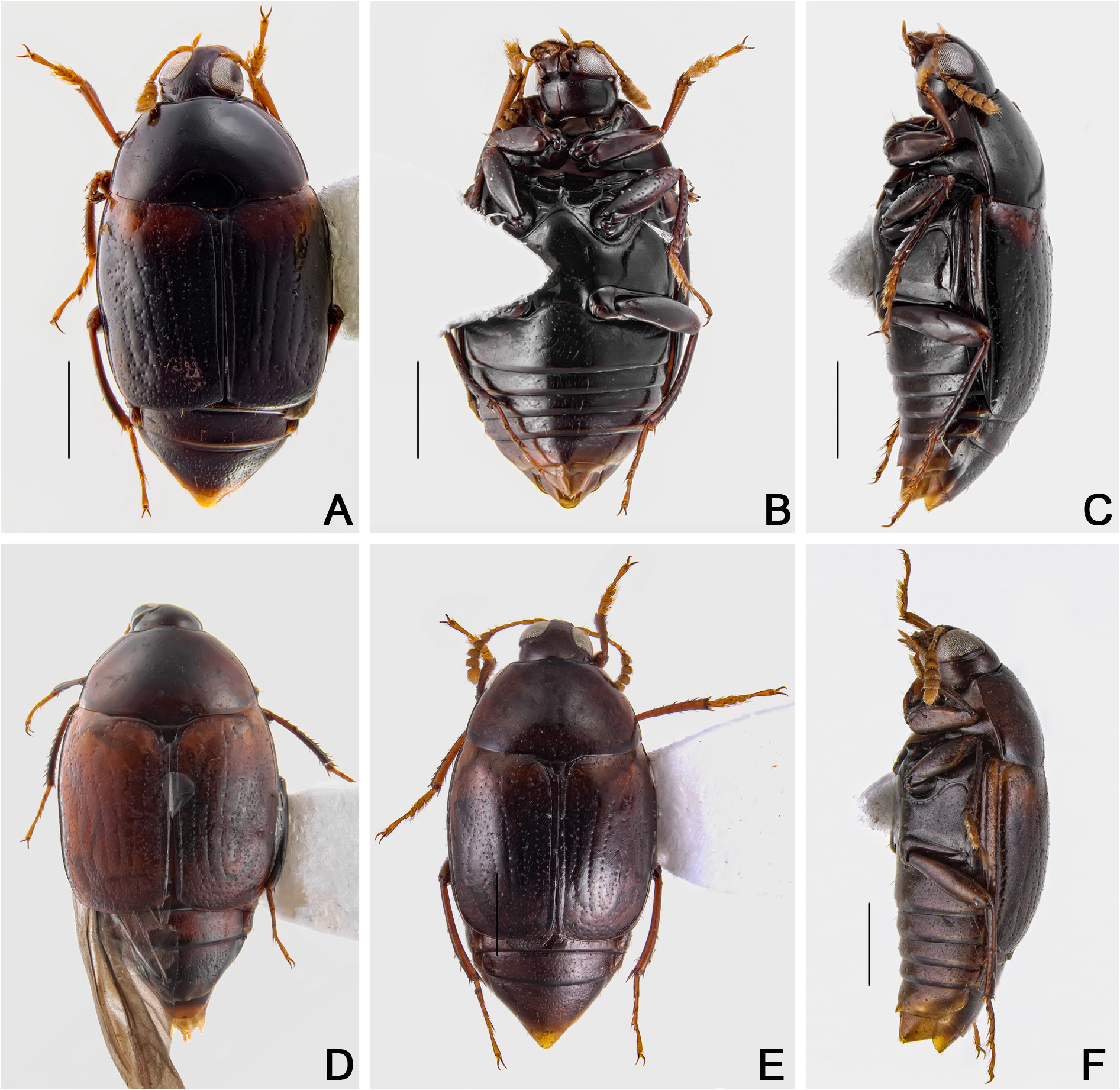
Cyparium pici sp. nov. A–C. Holotype, ♂ (CEMT). A. Dorsal view. B. Ventral view. C. Lateral view. D. Paratype, ♀ (CEMT), dorsal view. E–F. Paratype, ♂ (CEMT). E. Dorsal view. F. Lateral view. Specimens collected at Cotriguaçu (MT, Brazil). Scale bars = 1.0 mm.

== Description ==
Adults reach a length of about 3.35–4.20 mm (males) and 4.20–4.35 mm (females). They are black, with the antennae entirely yellow (the club lighter) and with the anterior region of the elytra reddish brown.

== Life history ==
No host fungus has been documented for this species.

== Etymology ==
The species is named in honour of Maurice Pic (1866–1957), who was responsible for gathering many specimens of scaphidiines deposited in museums, especially in the MNHN.
