= Leucocoprinus heinemannii =

Scientific classification
- Domain: Eukaryota
- Kingdom: Fungi
- Division: Basidiomycota
- Class: Agaricomycetes
- Order: Agaricales
- Family: Agaricaceae
- Genus: Leucocoprinus
- Species: L. heinemannii

Binomial name
- Leucocoprinus heinemannii Migl. (1987)

Synonyms
- Leucocoprinus heinemannii var. melanotrichoides P. Mohr (2004)

Species of fungus

Leucocoprinus heinemannii Mycological characteristics
- Gills on hymenium
- Cap is campanulate or convex
- Hymenium is free
- Stipe has a ring
- Spore print is white
- Ecology is saprotrophic
- Edibility is unknown

Leucocoprinus heinemannii is a species of mushroom producing fungus in the family Agaricaceae.

== Taxonomy ==
It was first described in 1987 by the Italian mycologist Vincenzo Migliozzi who classified it as Leucocoprinus heinemannii.

== Description ==
Leucocoprinus heinemannii is a small dapperling mushroom with thin white flesh.

Cap: 16-22mm wide when mature, campanulate when young but flattening or becoming convex with age with edges which may lift upwards. The surface is pure white with a slightly umbonate disc which has very fine grey, purple and black tones densely concentrated in the middle. These colours extend sparsely across the cap dissipating towards the edges where there are striations which extend around a quarter of the way into the cap. Gills: Free, crowded and white. Stem: Smooth, 12-35mm long, 5 cm at most and 2mm thick tapering from a slightly bulbous 5mm base where traces of white mycelium are present. The persistent stem ring is white with brown edges and located towards the middle of the stem (median). Spores: Ellipsoidal or amygdaliform without apparent germ pore. 6.3-7.4 x 3.5-4.2 μm. Smell: Indistinct/mushroomy. Taste: Indistinct.

== Habitat and distribution ==
L. heinemannii is not very well known and not often recorded. The first specimens studied were found growing individually in a greenhouse in Rome during the Autumn of 1985. GBIF has a few dozen recorded observations from all over the world since. A 2014 study of mushroom species found in botanical gardens in Poland documented L. heinemannii growing in a group under Dichondra and Euphorbia plants during several months of the year. This was the first recording of the species in Poland.

This species was also documented in Washington state in 2010 where it was found growing gregariously amongst soil in greenhouses.

== Similar species ==
Leucocoprinus ianthinus and Leucocoprinus brebissonii have some superficially similar details and are also known to grow in plant pots and greenhouses. There are also numerous species in the L. heinemannii species complex including L. tephrolepis, L. parvipileus and L. domingensis as documented from the Dominican Republican and US Virgin Islands in 2020. So identification of this species based solely on visual appearance may not be accurate.

Lepiota atrodisca can appear very similar with a white cap and blackish-grey disc. Leucoagaricus melanotrichus is similar as well.

== Etymology ==
The specific epithet heinemannii is named for the Belgian mycologist Paul Heinemann who classified numerous Leucocoprinus species in 1977.
