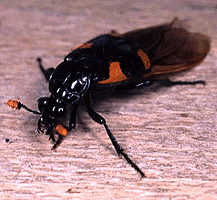

Scientific classification
- Kingdom: Animalia
- Phylum: Arthropoda
- Class: Insecta
- Order: Coleoptera
- Suborder: Polyphaga
- Infraorder: Staphyliniformia
- Family: Staphylinidae
- Genus: Nicrophorus
- Species: N. quadrimaculatus

Binomial name
- Nicrophorus quadrimaculatus Matthews, 1888

= Nicrophorus quadrimaculatus =

Species of beetle

Nicrophorus quadrimaculatus is a burying beetle described by Matthews in 1888.
