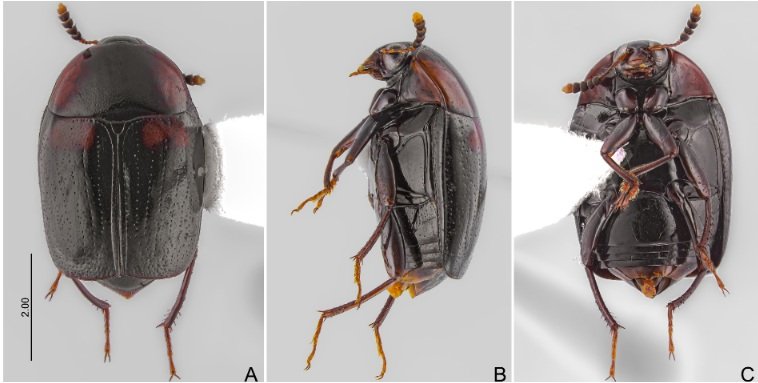

Scientific classification
- Kingdom: Animalia
- Phylum: Arthropoda
- Clade: Pancrustacea
- Class: Insecta
- Order: Coleoptera
- Suborder: Polyphaga
- Infraorder: Staphyliniformia
- Family: Staphylinidae
- Genus: Cyparium
- Species: C. fugitivum

Binomial name
- Cyparium fugitivum von Groll, 2025

= Cyparium fugitivum =

Species of beetle

Cyparium fugitivum is a species of beetle of the Staphylinidae family. This species is found in south-eastern Brazil (Minas Gerais).

Adults reach a length of about 4.4 mm and have a robust black body.

Adults have been collected from an undetermined mushroom on the border of a field trail.

== Etymology ==
The species epithet is a Latin word meaning 'runaway', because the holotype almost escaped when the author tried to collect it.
