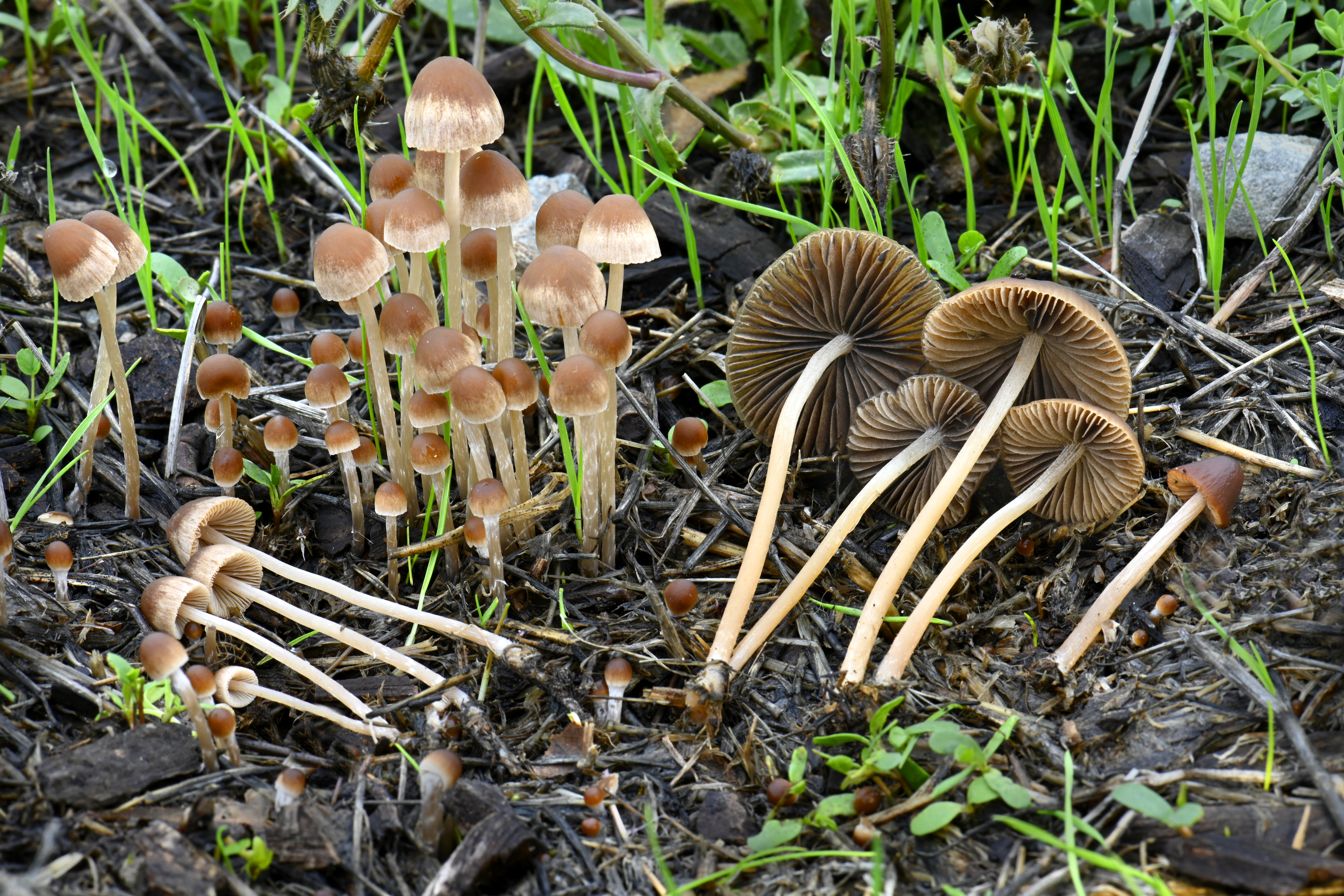
- In Oakland, California

Scientific classification
- Kingdom: Fungi
- Division: Basidiomycota
- Class: Agaricomycetes
- Order: Agaricales
- Family: Psathyrellaceae
- Genus: Psathyrella
- Species: P. corrugis

Binomial name
- Psathyrella corrugis (Pers.) Konrad & Maubl. 1949

Synonyms
- Agaricus gracilis Fr. 1821; Agaricus corrugis Pers. 1794; Agaricus gracilis var. gracilis Fr. 1821; Coprinarius gracilis (Fr.) P. Kumm. 1871; Drosophila gracilis (Fr.) Quél. 1888; Hypholoma gracile (Fr.) Hongo & Izawa 1994; Prunulus gracilis (Fr.) Gray 1821; Psathyra gracilis (Fr.) Fr. 1901; Psathyrella gracilis (Fr.) Quél., (1872); Psathyrella corrugis f. gracilis (Fr.) Enderle 1987

= Psathyrella corrugis =

Species of fungus

Psathyrella corrugis, is the type species of the basidiomycete fungus genus Psathyrella and family Psathyrellaceae. It is common in North America and is regarded as inedible.

== Taxonomy ==
It was originally described from Europe as Agaricus corrugis.

The lectotype of Psathyrella is P. gracilis, but naming priority is given to P. corrugis, published in 1794 (27 years earlier than P. gracilis).

== Description ==
The cap is 1–4 centimetres (1/2–1 1/2 in) wide, bell-shaped and translucent when young; it flattens and becomes opaque with age. The gills are slightly reddish. The whitish stalk is 4–12 cm (1 5/8–4 3/4 in) tall and 1–3 mm wide. The spores are purple-brown, elliptical, and smooth. The spore print is dark brown to black, sometimes with hints of purple.

The species is considered non-toxic but lacking in flesh, flavor and texture. It is inedible.

=== Similar species ===
A similar species is Candolleomyces candolleanus. Microscopy may be needed to distinguish P. corrugis from similar species.

== Habitat and distribution ==
It can be found growing around areas of dead wood and grass throughout North America.

It sometimes fruits with Tubaria furfuracea.

== Gallery ==
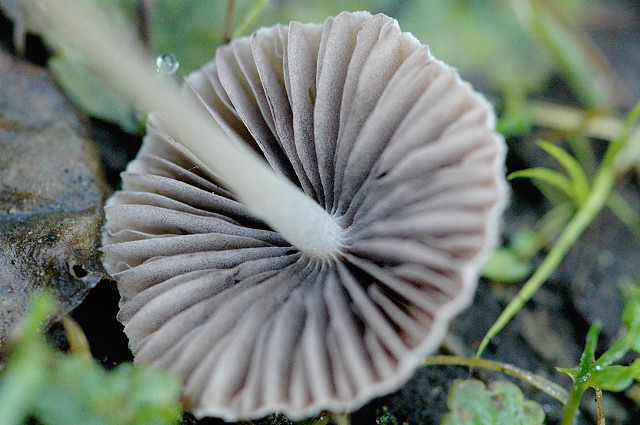

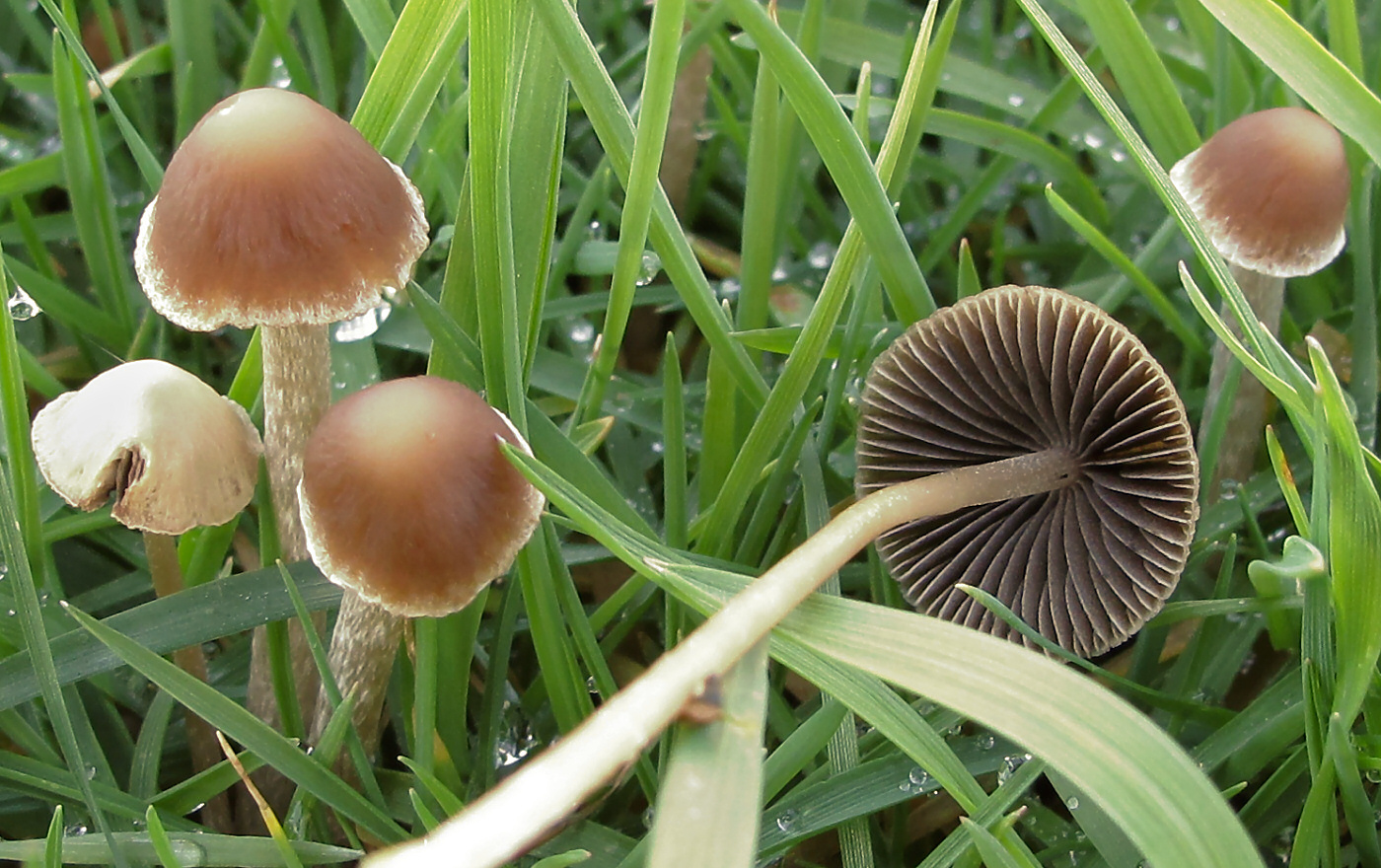

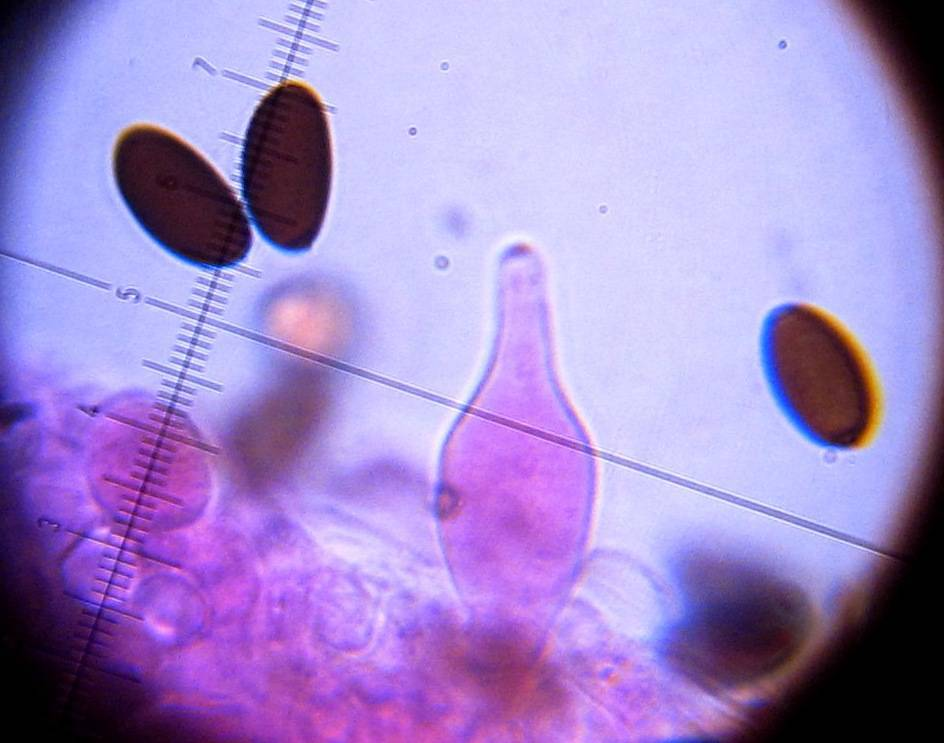

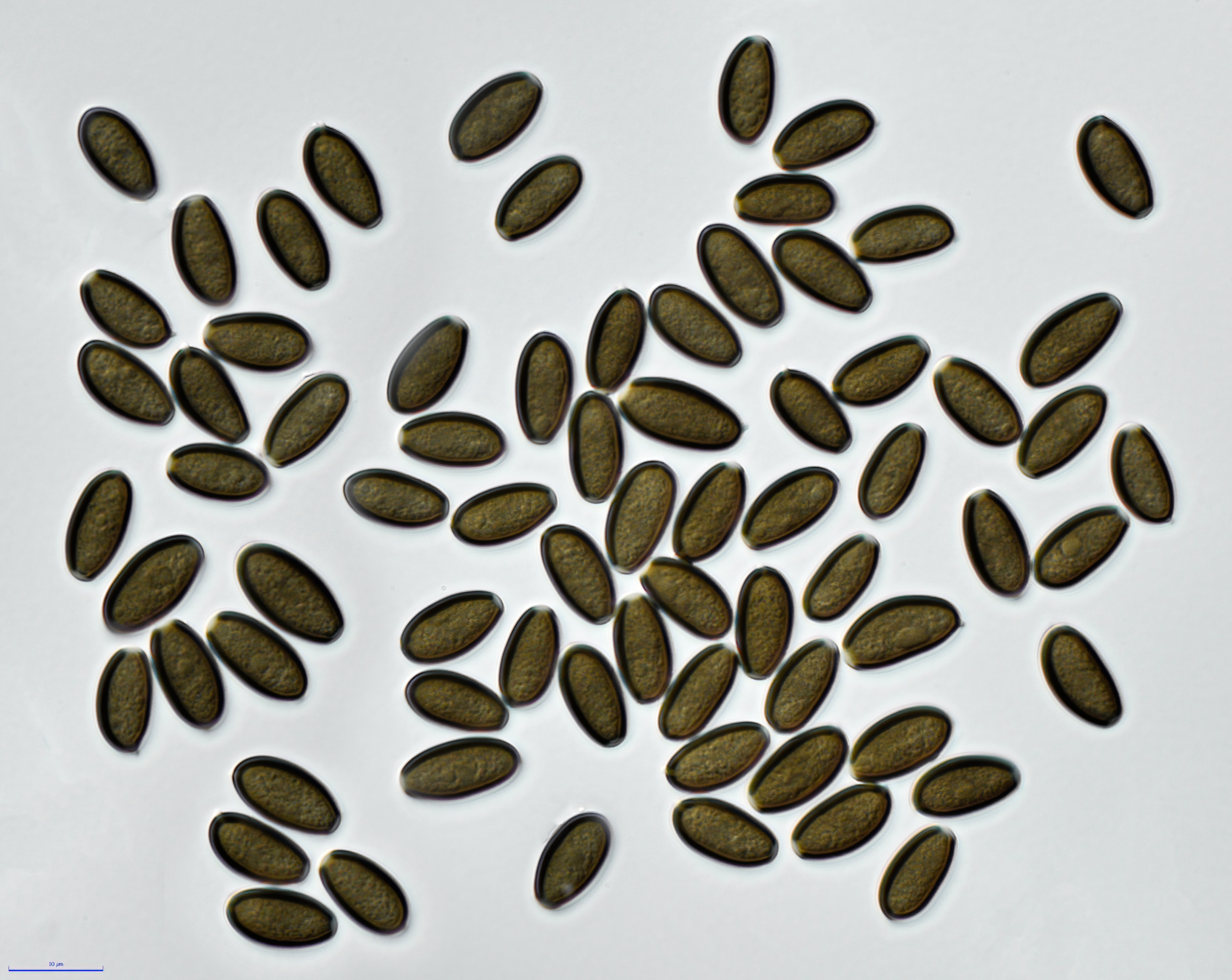
