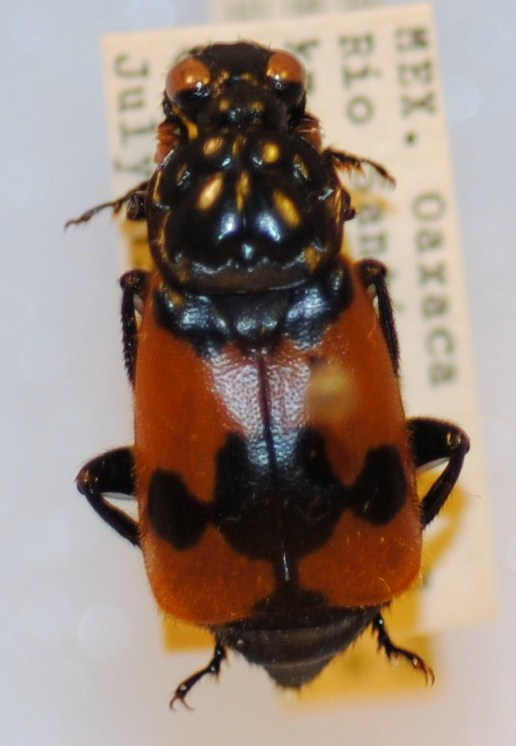
- Nicrophorus olidus

Scientific classification
- Kingdom: Animalia
- Phylum: Arthropoda
- Class: Insecta
- Order: Coleoptera
- Suborder: Polyphaga
- Infraorder: Staphyliniformia
- Family: Staphylinidae
- Genus: Nicrophorus
- Species: N. olidus

Binomial name
- Nicrophorus olidus Matthews, 1888

Synonyms
- Necrophorus [sic] quadricollis Gistel, 1848 (Unav.); Necrophorus [sic] olidus Matthews, 1888

= Nicrophorus olidus =

Species of beetle

Nicrophorus olidus is a burying beetle described by Matthews in 1888.
