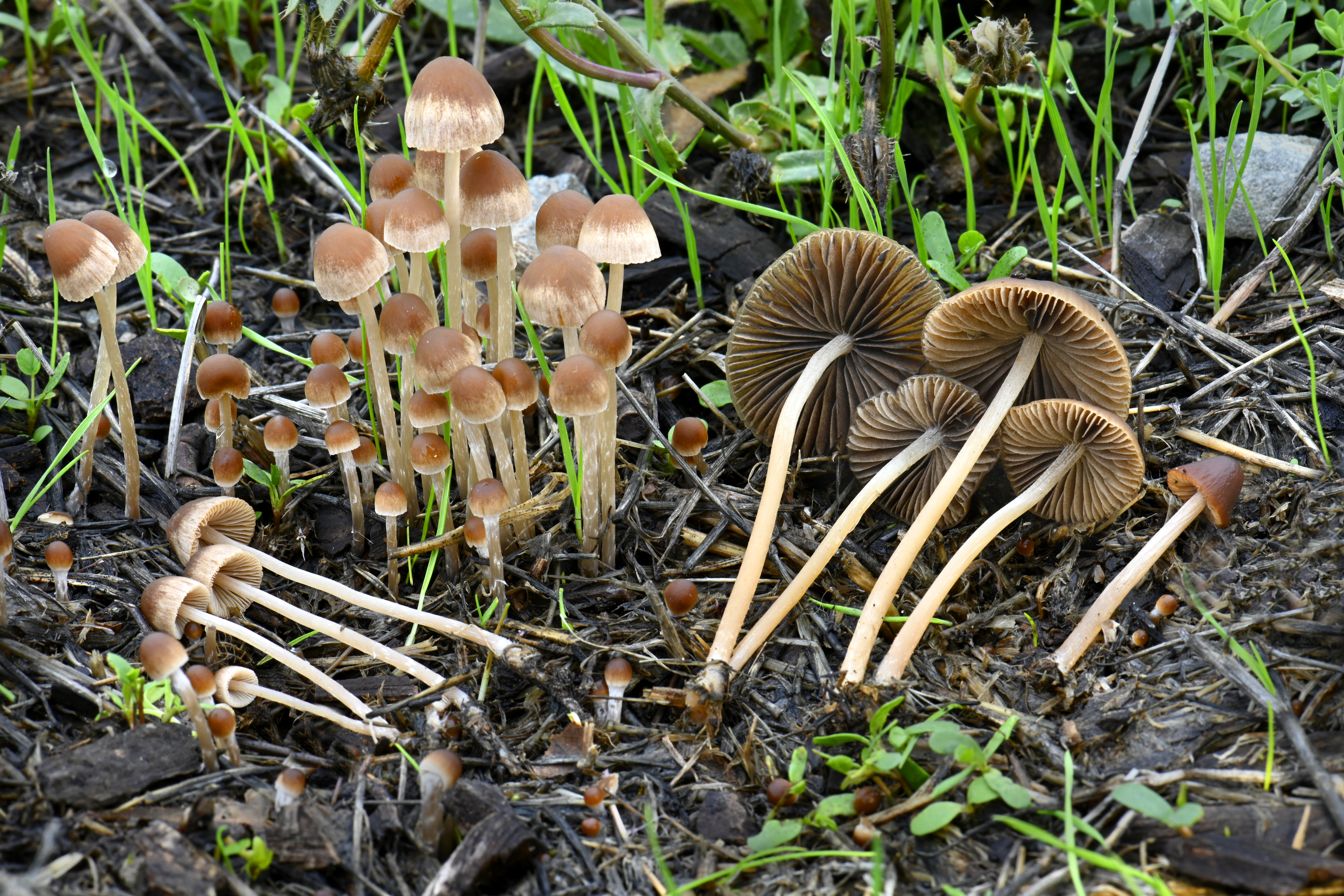
- Psathyrella corrugis

Scientific classification
- Kingdom: Fungi
- Division: Basidiomycota
- Class: Agaricomycetes
- Order: Agaricales
- Family: Psathyrellaceae
- Genus: Psathyrella (Fr.) Quél. (1872)

Type species
- Psathyrella gracilis (Fr.) Quél. (1872)

= Psathyrella =

Genus of fungi

Psathyrella is a large genus of about 600 species, and is similar to the genera Coprinellus, Coprinopsis, Coprinus and Panaeolus, usually with a thin cap and white or yellowish white hollow stem. The caps do not self digest as do those of Coprinellus and Coprinopsis. Some also have brown spores rather than black. These fungi are often drab-colored, difficult to identify, and all members are considered inedible or worthless (for eating) and so they are often overlooked. However they are quite common and can occur at times when there are few other mushrooms to be seen. The first report of a gilled mushroom fruiting underwater is Psathyrella aquatica.

The genus name Psathyrella is a diminutive form of Psathyra, derived from the Greek word ψαθυρος, psathuros 'friable'. The type species of Psathyrella is Psathyrella gracilis, which is now known as Psathyrella corrugis.

== Characteristics ==
In order to identify the species it may be necessary to take into account the presence and nature of any veil remnants on cap (which may only be visible on very young fruiting bodies), the colour of young fruiting bodies, which is often more vivid than with older ones, whether the cap is hygrophanous (it can well be a translucent brown or ochre colour in a humid state but a pure opaque white on drying out), and the spore size and the presence and nature of cheilocystidia, pleurocystidia and caulocystidia, distinctive sterile cells on the gill face, gill edge and stipe respectively. All Psathyrella species are unusually fragile, and both the cap and stem break with very little effort. Unlike most agarics, the caps of Psathyrella species easily break into triangular shaped pieces.

The fruit body are small to medium in size and are found mainly on wood or humus. The cap is conical to convex or flat, often hygrophanous, generally not slimy, and typically some shade of brown, beige, or gray. The flesh is markedly fragile. The gills are typically dark brown to black when mature and adnate or adnexed to the stem. The stem is slender, fragile, and white or pale. The spore print is dark brown to purplish brown or blackened, or rarely reddish. The spores are smooth or rough and have a germination pore. The spores turn opaque red or blue in the presence of concentrated sulfuric acid. The pileipellis is cellular.

== Selected species ==
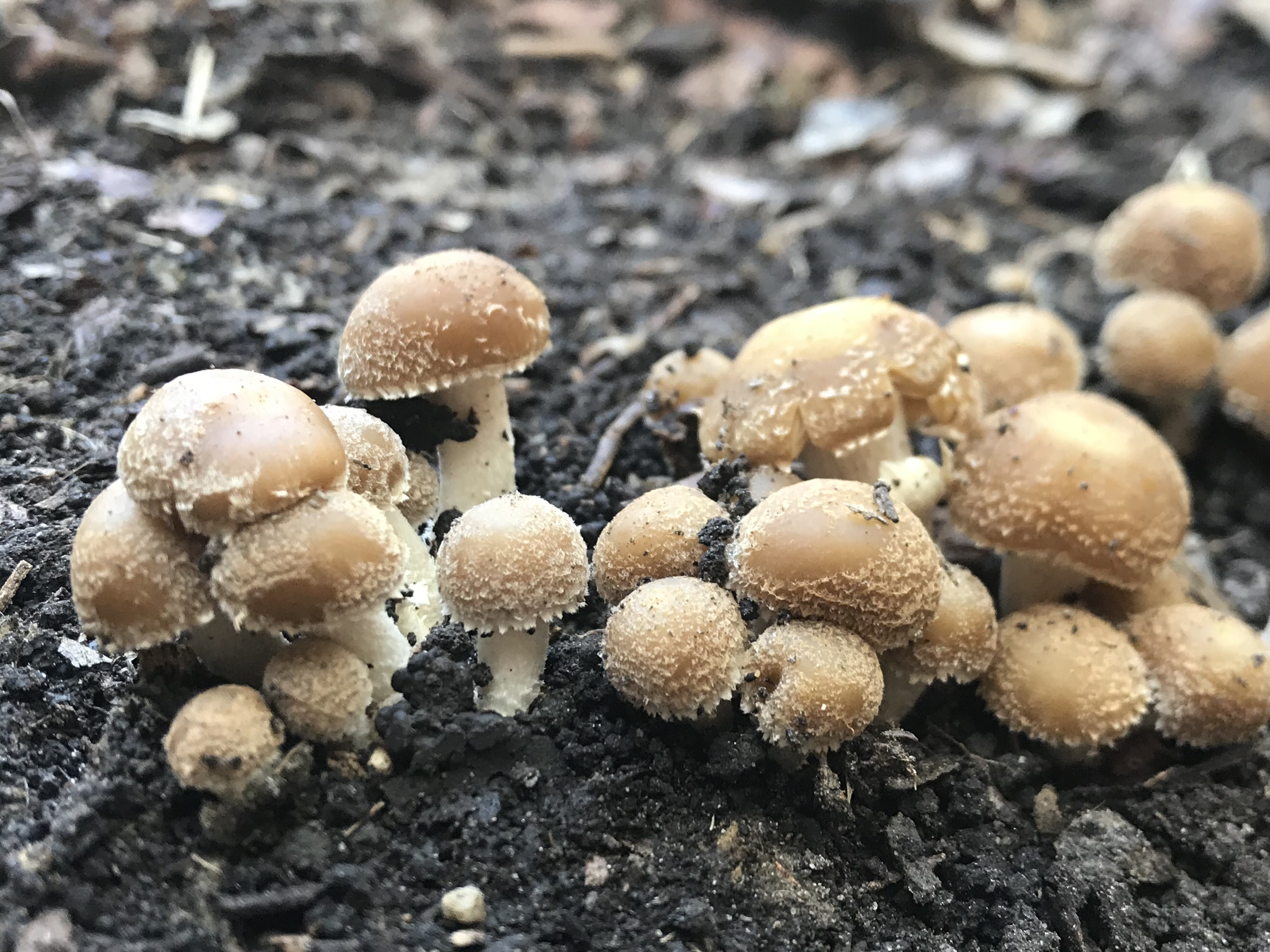
Psathyrella candolleana fruiting bodies

For complete list see List of Psathyrella species

- Psathyrella ammophila (dune brittlestem)
- Psathyrella aquatica
- Psathyrella bipellis
- Psathyrella candolleana (pale brittlestem)
- Psathyrella corrugis (red edge brittlestem) (type sp., older synonym of Psathyrella gracilis)
- Psathyrella piluliformis / Psathyrella hydrophila (common stump brittlestem)
