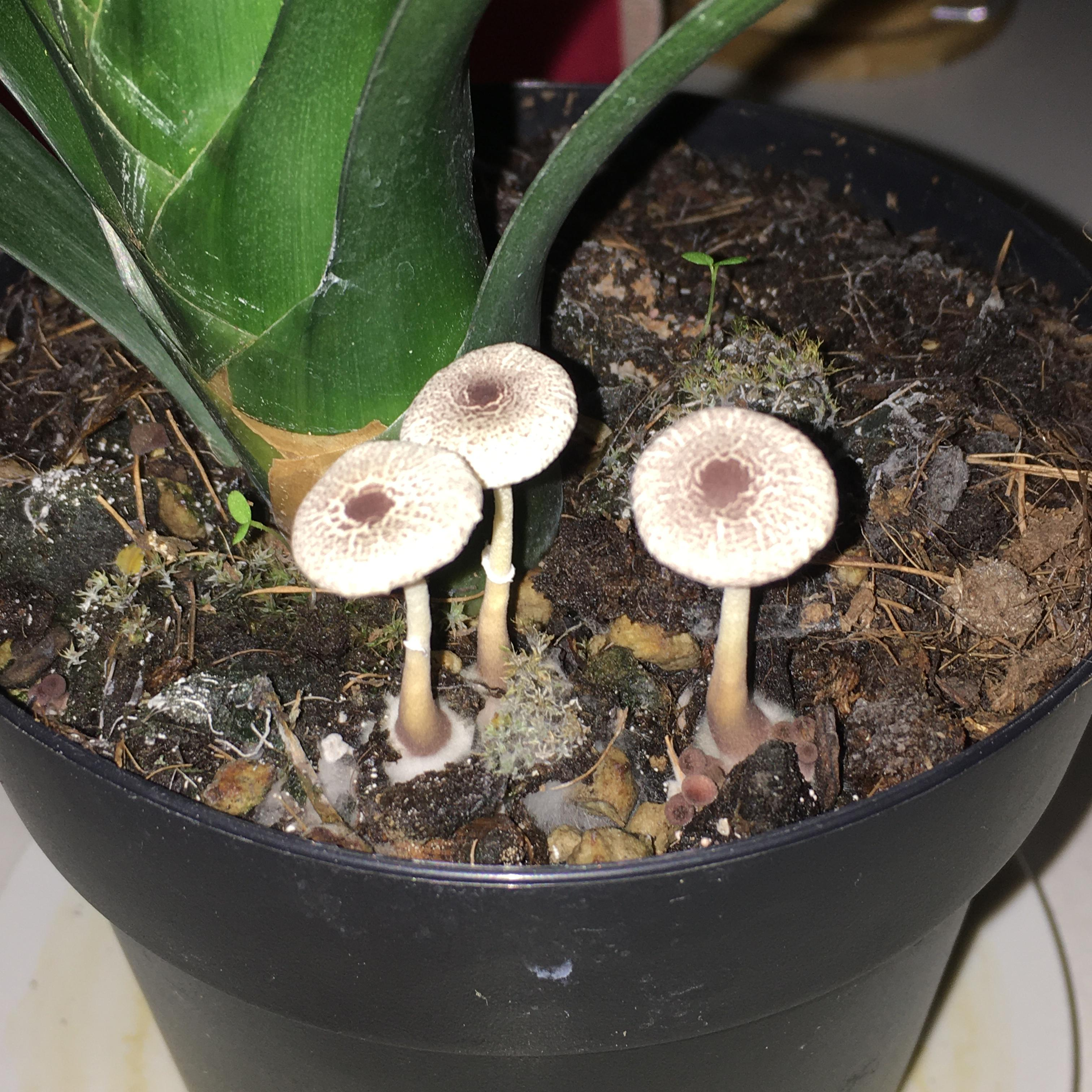

Scientific classification
- Kingdom: Fungi
- Division: Basidiomycota
- Class: Agaricomycetes
- Order: Agaricales
- Family: Agaricaceae
- Genus: Leucocoprinus
- Species: L. ianthinus

Binomial name
- Leucocoprinus ianthinus (Sacc) P.Mohr (1994)

Synonyms
- Agaricus ianthinus Cooke (1888); Lepiota ianthina Sacc (1891); Lepiota lilacinogranulosa Henn. (1898); Hiatula cepistipes var. lilacinogranulosa R. Heim & Romagn (1934); Leucocoprinus lilacinogranulosus Locq. (1943); Leucocoprinus ianthinus Locq. (1945); Leucocoprinus lilacinogranulosus var. subglobisporus D.A. Reid (1989); Leucocoprinus ianthinus var. subglobisporus Blanco-Dios (1989)

= Leucocoprinus ianthinus =

Species of fungus

Leucocoprinus ianthinus is a species of mushroom producing fungus in the family Agaricaceae. Like several other Leucocoprinus species it may have originated in a tropical climate but now finds a home in plant pots, greenhouses and compost piles in many countries. It is not seen in plant pots with the same kind of regularity as the well known Leucocoprinus birnbaumii and not seen in the wild as frequently as Leucocoprinus brebissonii.

Leucocoprinus ianthinus
- Mycological characteristics
- Gills on hymenium
- Cap is campanulate or flat
- Hymenium is free
- Stipe has a ring
- Spore print is white
- Ecology is saprotrophic
- Edibility is unknown

== Taxonomy ==
It was first described in 1888 by the English botanist and mycologist Mordecai Cubitt Cooke who classified it as Agaricus (Lepiota) ianthinus based on specimens collected in the hothouses of Kew Gardens (London, England) in 1888. In 1891 the Italian mycologist Pier Andrea Saccardo reclassified it as Lepiota ianthinus or Lepiota janthina in the original text. It was reclassified as Leucocoprinus ianthinus in 1945 by Marcel Locquin.

An additional basionym was classified as Lepiota lilacinogranulosa or Lepiota lilacino-granulosa by the German mycologist Paul Christoph Hennings in 1898. In 1934 the French botanists and mycologists Roger Heim and Henri Romagnesi reclassified it as a variant of Hiatula cepaestipes (now known as Leucocoprinus cepistipes). The species was reclassified as Leucocoprinus lilacinogranulosa by Locquin in 1943. This is now also considered a synonym of Leucocoprinus ianthinus however some mycologists do consider them as separate, but similar looking species.

== Description ==
Leucocoprinus ianthinus is a small dapperling mushroom with thin white flesh.

Cap: 1.5-7cm, starting ovate/hemispherical before expanding to campanulate (bell shaped) with age with a prominent umbo and then plano-convex with age. The surface is whitish with a dark purple to reddish brown centre and purplish scales spreading across the cap but becoming sparse at towards the edges. The margins have striations that extend two thirds of the way across the cap or up to the umbo. They may split radially and discolour yellowish with age and it is common for them to curve inwards with age. Gills: Free, moderately crowded and white. Stem: 3.5-7cm long and 2-5mm wide tapering upwards from a slightly bulbous base and hollow interior. The surface is yellowish white towards the top of the stem, whitish below the ring and then with a violet to lilac fibrillose coating at the base and a white tomentous covering at the bulb. The white, ascending, stem ring has a purplish margin but may disappear. Spore print: White to pale lilac. Spores: A different range of sizes is given by different sources: 8–12 x 5.5–7.5 μm or 6.5–10 x 5.75–6.5 μm or 9.5-10.5 x 6.5-7 μm. Ellipsoid to amygdaliform with a thick wall and a germ pore that is covered with a hyaline cap. Dextrinoid, congophilous and cyanophilous. In cresyl blue a pink colouration is visible in the inner wall of the spore. Basidia: 17–42 x 8–11 μm. Four spored or rarely two spored. Smell: fungal, strong and astringent. Taste: fungal.

== Similar species ==
- Leucocoprinus brebissonii can appear similar but is distinguished by the darker brown colour of the centre disc and the white stem which lacks a purplish base. It is more commonly found in the wild rather than in plant pots.
- Leucocoprinus heinemannii and some related, possibly undescribed species in the Heinemannii complex may appear similar but with black scales.
- Leucocoprinus lilacinogranulosus is considered a synonym for L. ianthinus however some sources suggest they may be separate species.
