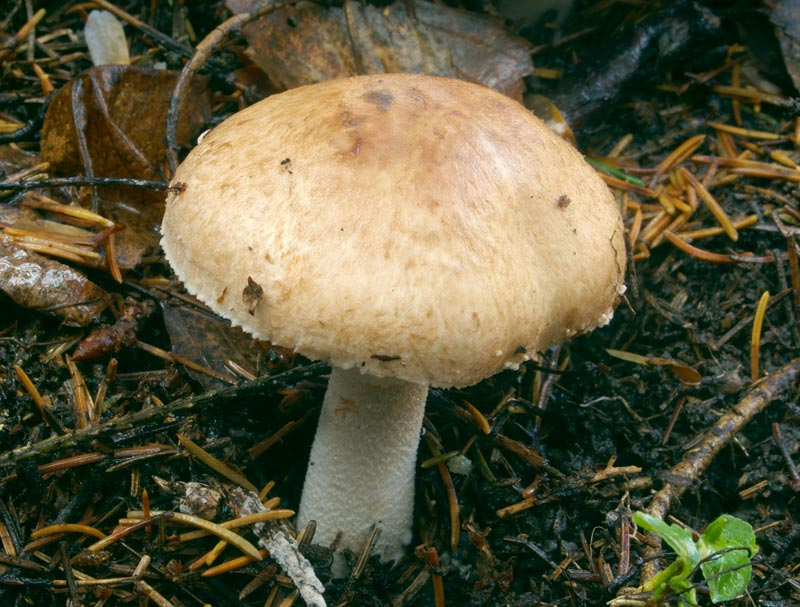

Scientific classification
- Kingdom: Fungi
- Division: Basidiomycota
- Class: Agaricomycetes
- Order: Agaricales
- Family: Agaricaceae
- Genus: Agaricus
- Species: A. silvaticus

Binomial name
- Agaricus silvaticus Schaeff. 1774

= Agaricus silvaticus =

Species of fungus

Agaricus silvaticus
- Mycological characteristics
- Gills on hymenium
- Cap is flat
- Hymenium attachment is not applicable
- Stipe has a ring
- Spore print is brown
- Ecology is saprotrophic
- Edibility is choice

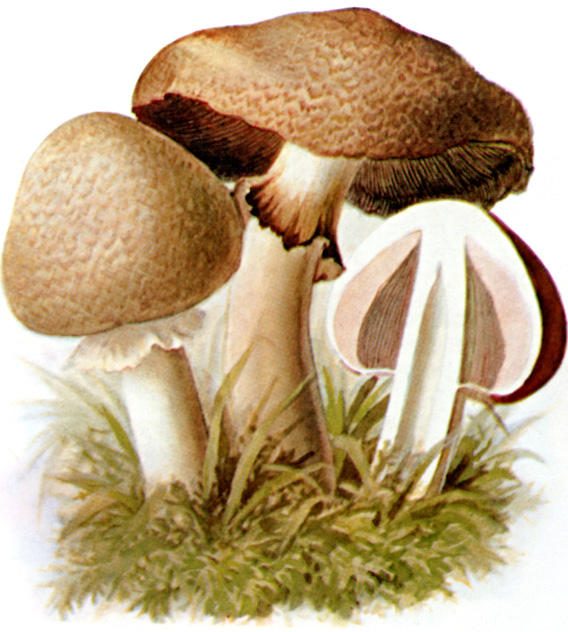
Botanical illustration

Agaricus silvaticus (or Agaricus sylvaticus), otherwise known as the scaly wood mushroom, blushing wood mushroom, or pinewood mushroom, is a species of mushroom.

== Naming ==
The species name sylvaticus (or silvaticus) means "of the woods". Both spellings are found in the literature, but Species Fungorum gives sylvaticus as the current name and so that version should be preferred.

This well-known species was first validly described under the current name, Agaricus silvaticus, in 1774 by the early mycologist Jacob Christian Schäffer. At that time most gilled mushrooms were all grouped under the genus Agaricus, but later were allocated to new genera which reflected their different characteristics. Now Agaricus has a much more restricted meaning, being the genus of the common cultivated mushrooms of Europe and America, but A. sylvaticus belongs to that group and has kept the same name during all that time.

== Description ==
The greyish-brown cap is hemispherical when young, but later flattens out, growing up to 10 centimetres (4 in) in diameter. It is covered with broad scales. The gills are grey when young and become much darker with age. The spores are chocolate brown. The stem is brownish, often with a hanging ring and a small bulb at the base. The flesh is white with a mild taste, turning reddish when cut.

=== Similar species ===
Agaricus haemorrhoidarius is normally considered a synonym, but has also been defined as a separate species, distinguished by its flesh which immediately turns red when cut. Agaricus phaeolepidotus is distinguished by a stem which yellows (in addition to turning pink) when cut. The cap background is browner than A. silvaticus and its smell suggests iodine or ink. Tricholoma vaccinum looks similar from above but has no ring and develops reddish-brown gills.

Some lookalikes cause gastric upset.

== Habitat and distribution ==
The species is often found in groups in coniferous forests from early summer, or September through to November in Europe, North Africa and North America.

== Uses ==
The species is edible cooked, but resembles inedible mushrooms.

== See also ==
- List of Agaricus species
