= Andrew Matthews (entomologist) =

British clergyman and entomologist (1815–1897)

The Reverend Andrew Matthews
- Born: 18 June 1815
- Died: 14 September 1897 (aged 82)
- Occupations: Clergyman and entomologist

Andrew Matthews, M.A. (18 June 1815 – 14 September 1897) was a British clergyman and entomologist who specialised in beetles (Coleoptera).

In an obituary in The Zoologist the reverend Matthews is called a "well-known British naturalist." He was more widely known as an entomologist than an ornithologist. He was also a successful floriculturist.

Little is known of him. According to the frontispiece of his 1878 book Trichopterygia illustrata he was styled "The Reverend", and held an M.A. degree from Oxford University.

When he died, aged eighty-two, he had been a rector at Gumley, Leicestershire for forty-four years.

He studied some of the tiniest beetles, which are the most difficult to identify. He described several species, notably in the genus Nicrophorus, and is the binomial authority for at least three. His collection passed to Philip Brookes Mason, of Burton-on-Trent, who edited some of Matthews' papers for posthumous publication.

His chief entomological interests were in the families Trichopterygia, Corylophidae and Sphaeriidae.

== Species described ==
- Nicrophorus mexicanus (1888)
- Nicrophorus montezumae (1888), junior synonym of N. marginatus
- Nicrophorus olidus (1888)
- Nicrophorus quadrimaculatus (1888)

== Publications ==
- The Rev. A. Matthews, M.A. Oxon (January 1878). Trichopterygia illustrata et descripta: A Monograph of the Trichopterygia. London: E. W. Janson – via archive.org.
- Sharp, David; Matthews, Andrew; Lewis, George (1887–1905). Bates, Henry Walter (ed.). Biologia Centrali-Americana. Insecta. Coleoptera. Vol. II, Part 1. London: Bernard Quaritch Ltd.
- The Rev. A. Matthews, M.A. (1899). Mason, Philip B. (ed.). A Monograph of the Coleopterous Families Corylophidae and Sphaeriidae. London: O. E. Janson & Son – via archive.org.
- The Rev. A. Matthews, M.A. (1900). Mason, Philip B. (ed.). Trichopterygia illustrata et descripta: A Monograph of the Trichopterygia – Supplement. London: O. E. Janson & Son – via archive.org.

== Sources ==
- Distant, W.L., ed. (1897). "Obituary: Rev. Andrew Matthews". The Zoologist. 4th series, vol 1 (issue 676): 466.
