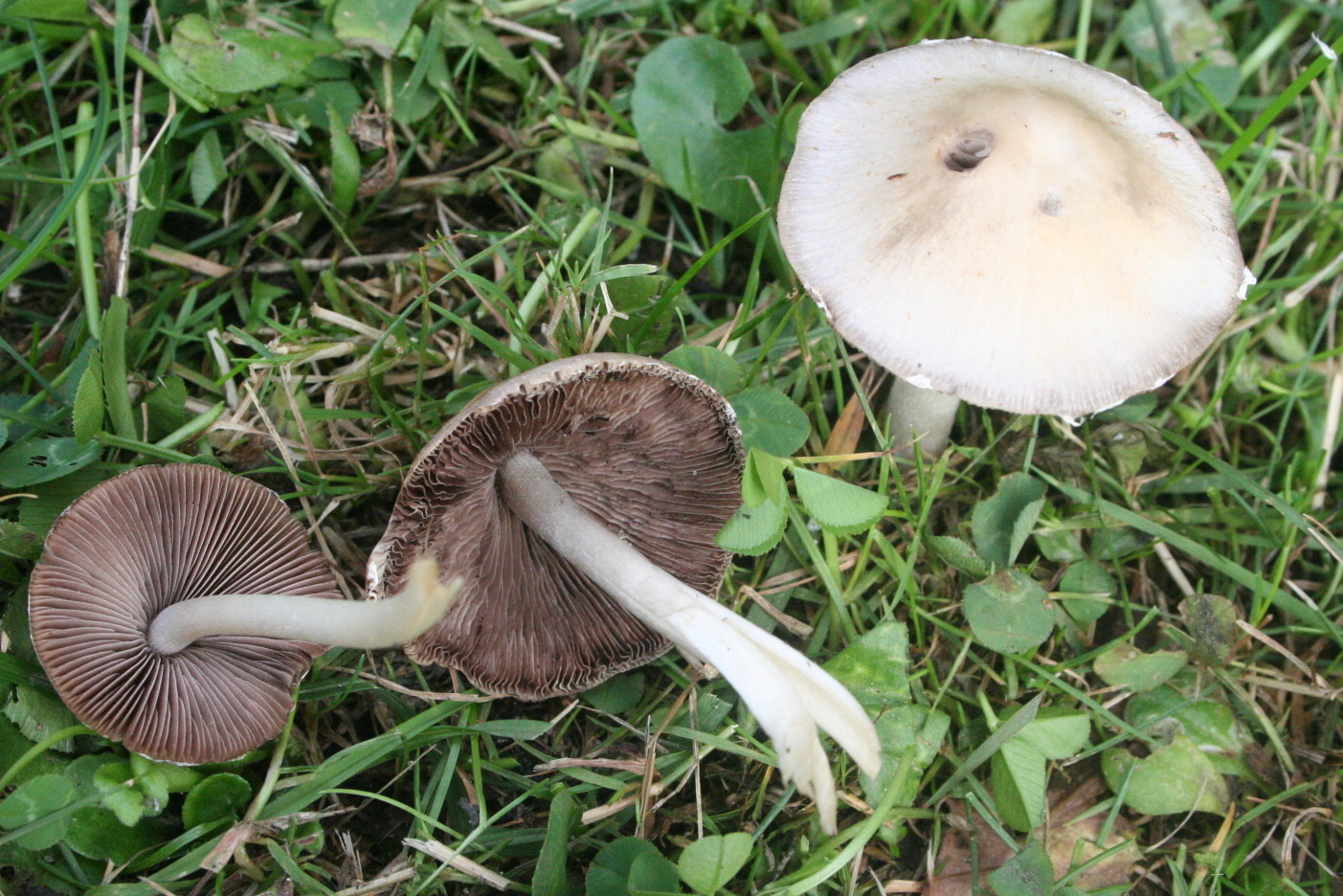

Scientific classification
- Kingdom: Fungi
- Division: Basidiomycota
- Class: Agaricomycetes
- Order: Agaricales
- Family: Psathyrellaceae
- Genus: Candolleomyces
- Species: C. candolleanus

Binomial name
- Candolleomyces candolleanus (Fr.) D. Wächt. & A. Melzer (2020)

Synonyms
- Agaricus violaceolamellatus DC. (1805); Agaricus candolleanus Fr. (1818); Hypholoma candolleanum (Fr.) Quél. (1872); Drosophila candolleana (Fr.) Quél. (1886); Psathyra candolleana (Fr.) G.Bertrand (1901); Psathyrella candolleana (Fr.) Maire (1937)

= Candolleomyces candolleanus =

Species of fungus

Candolleomyces candolleanus
- Mycological characteristics
- Gills on hymenium
- Cap is conical or convex
- Hymenium is adnate or seceding
- Stipe is bare or has a ring
- Spore print is purple-brown
- Ecology is saprotrophic
- Edibility is edible but not recommended

Candolleomyces candolleanus (formerly known as Psathyrella candolleana), commonly known as the common brittlestem, is a species of fungus in the family Psathyrellaceae. The color is tannish when young, fading to white. It is found in lawns in North America.

== Description ==
The cap is tan when young, fading to whitish, and growing to 2–8 cm (1–3 in) in diameter; they are initially conical, later becoming rounded and finally with upturned margins in maturity. The cap margin is irregular and radially asymmetrical—a defining characteristic of this species. It can retain veil fragments on the edge and center. The white stalk is 4–10 cm (1.5–4 in) tall and 3–7 mm wide. The spore print is purple-brown, while spores are smooth and elliptical, measuring 6.5–8 by 4–5 μm.

=== Similar species ===
One similar species is Psathyrella gracilis. Some species may have darker caps when young, drying to match that of C. candolleanus. Also similar are C. tuberculatus, Britzelmayria multipedata, and members of Coprinopsis and Psathyrella.

== Etymology ==
The specific epithet candolleanus honors Swiss botanist Augustin Pyramus de Candolle.

== Distribution ==
It is commonly found growing in small groups around stumps and tree roots on lawns and pastures in North America and Europe. In 2014, it was reported from Iraq.

== Edibility ==
While it is edible and may have a good flavor, it is not recommended due to its thin flesh, alleged poor culinary value and consistency, as well as difficulty in identification.

== See also ==
- List of Psathyrella species
