= List of Psathyrella species =

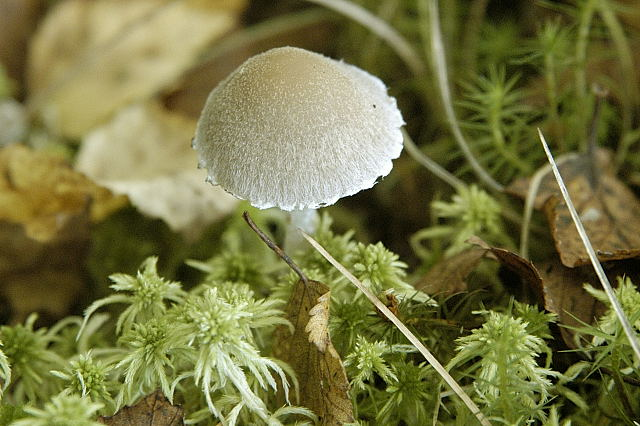
Psathyrella artemisiae

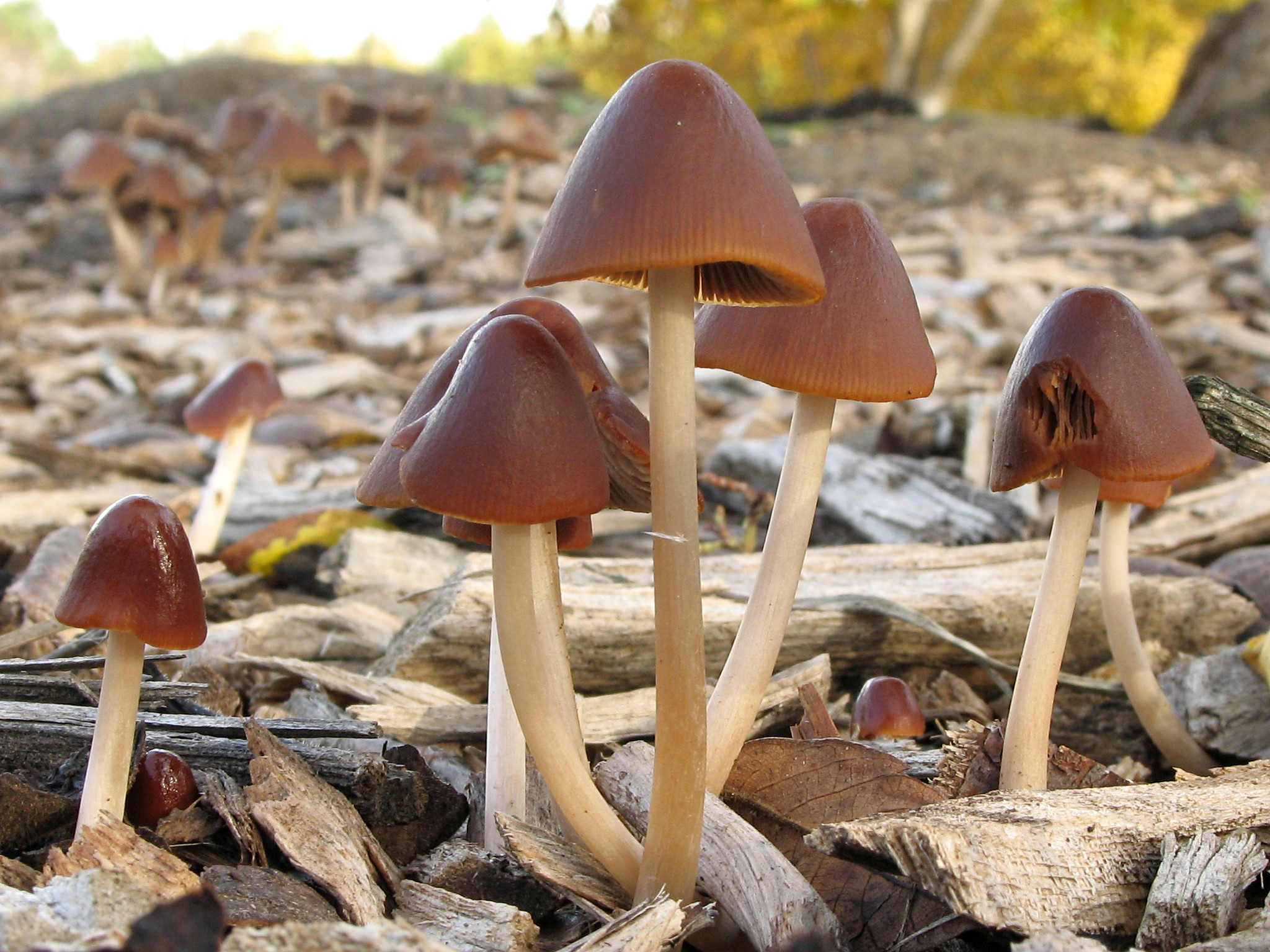
Psathyrella atrospora

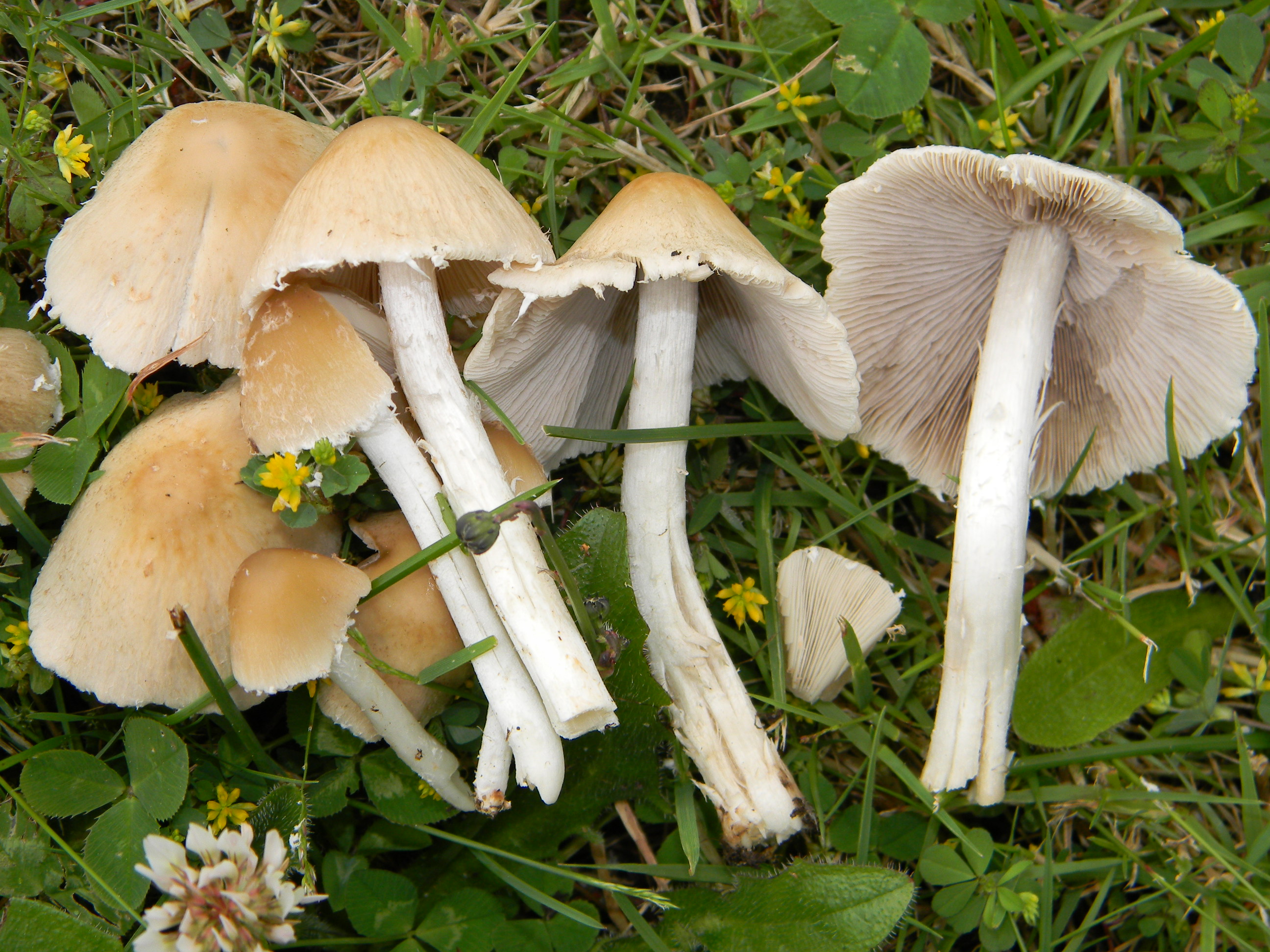
Psathyrella candolleana

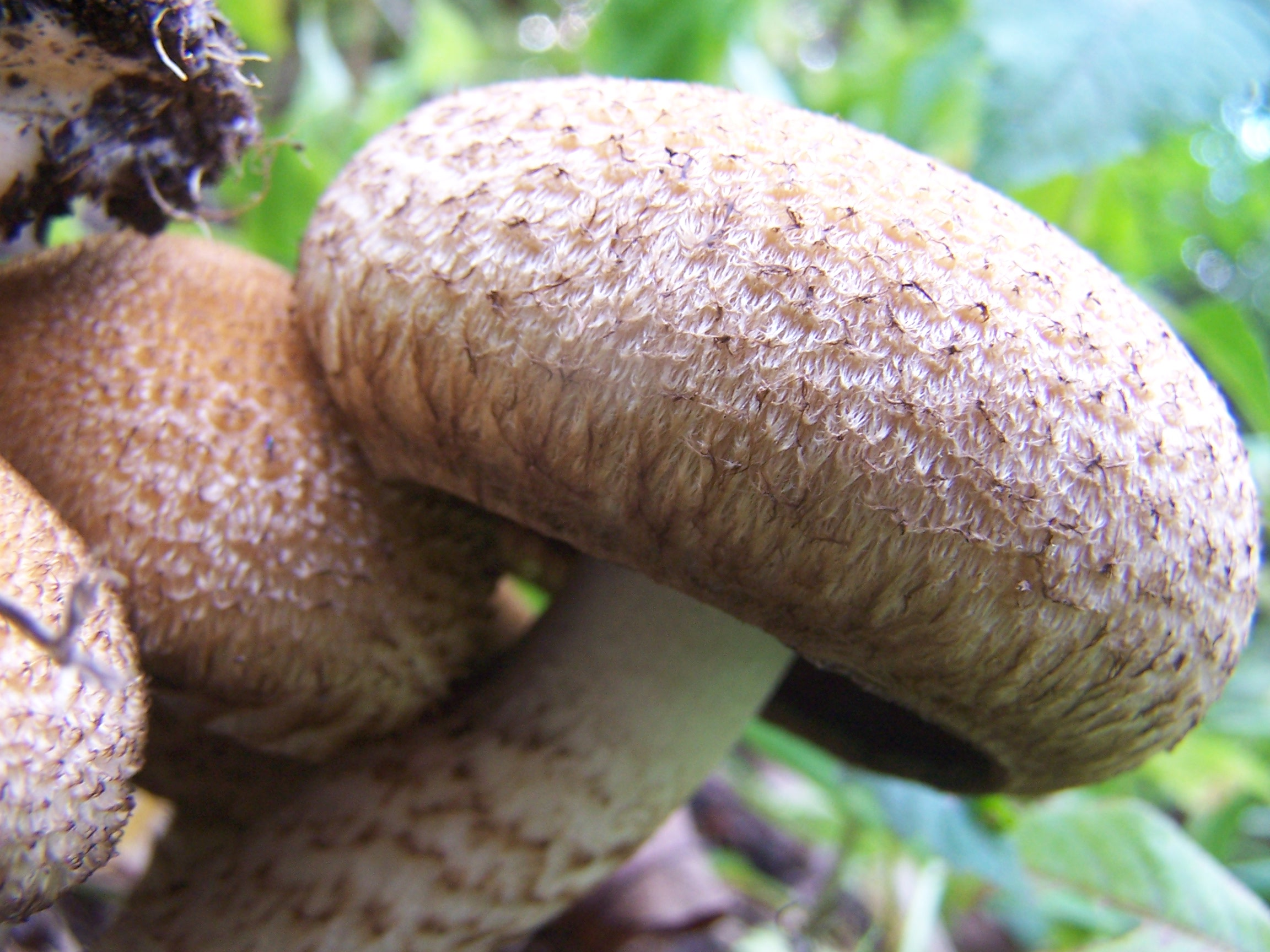
Psathyrella echiniceps

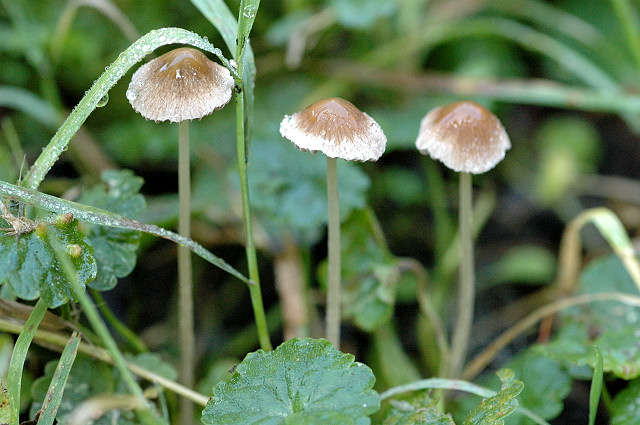
Psathyrella gracilis

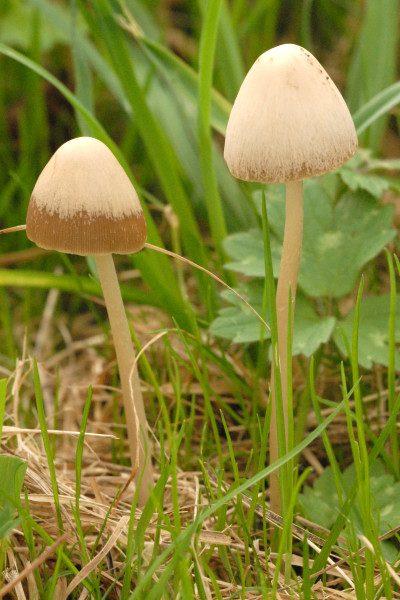
Psathyrella marcescibilis

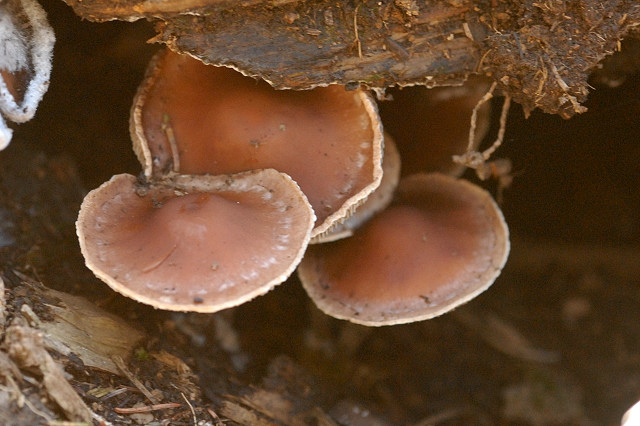
Psathyrella olympiana

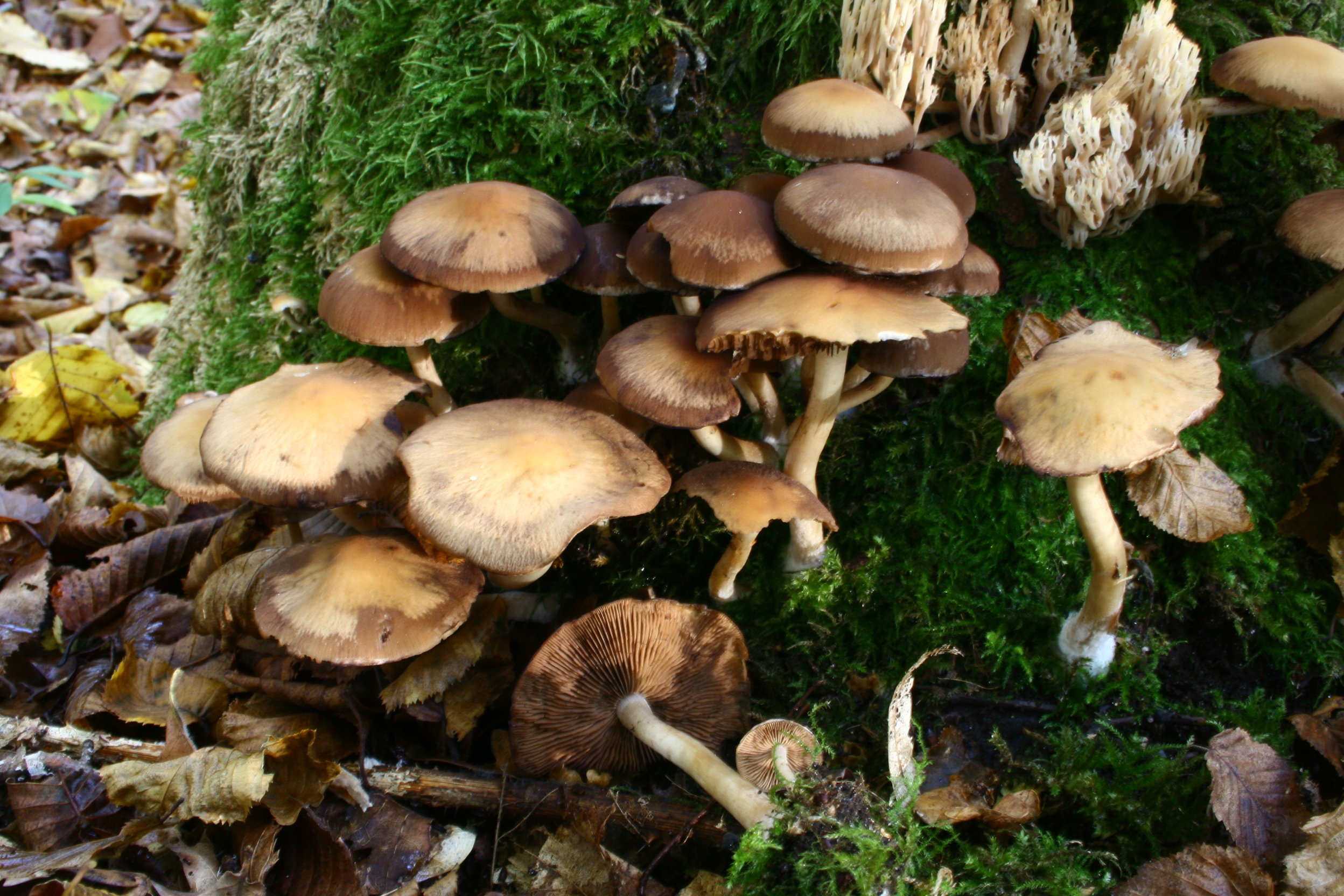
Psathyrella piluliformis

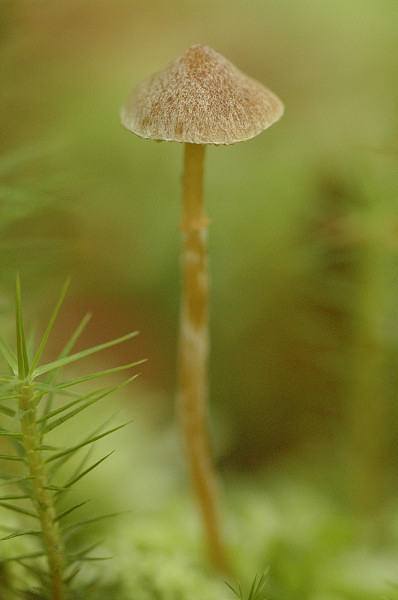
Psathyrella sphagnicola

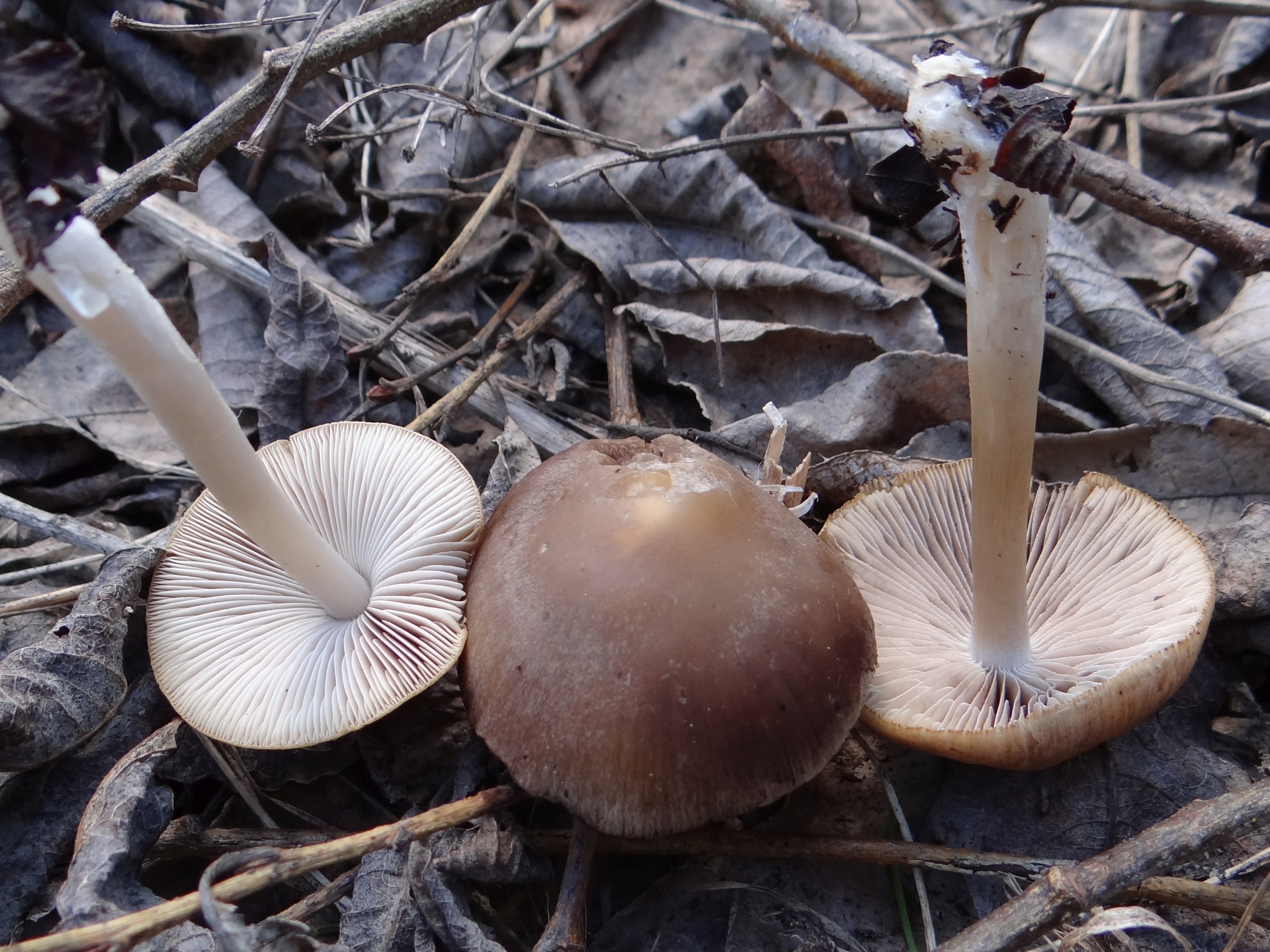
Psathyrella spadiceogrisea

This is a list of Psathyrella species. Many of its members were formerly classified in the genera Hypholoma, Psilocybe, and Stropharia. Also some well-known species have been moved to new genera, for instance Psathyrella spadicea is now Homophron spadiceum. Lacrymaria lacrymabunda has often been classified as a Psathyrella. According to one 2008 estimate, the genus contains about 400 species.

In 2020 many members of the family Psathyrellaceae were reclassified by the German mycologists Dieter Wächter & Andreas Melzer based on phylogenetic analysis. This study created the new genera Britzelmayria, Candolleomyces and Olotia and placed numerous former Psathyrella species within them. Notable changes include Psathyrella candolleana being reclassified as Candolleomyces candolleanus and Psathyrella multipedata being reclassified as Britzelmayria multipedata.

== Species ==
As of July 2022, Species Fungorum accepted 660 species of Psathyrella. With classification work ongoing this list is likely to be subject to regular alterations.

1. Psathyrella abieticola A.H. Sm. (1972)
2. Psathyrella abortiva A.H. Sm. (1972)
3. Psathyrella acadiensis A.H. Sm. (1972)
4. Psathyrella aculeata W.W. Patrick & Barrows (1979)
5. Psathyrella acuticystis A.H. Sm. (1972)
6. Psathyrella acutilamella J. Favre (1948)
7. Psathyrella acutisquamosa Dennis (1961)
8. Psathyrella acutissima Singer (1969)
9. Psathyrella acutoconica A.H. Sm. (1972)
10. Psathyrella aequatoriae Singer (1978)
11. Psathyrella affinis A.H. Sm. (1972)
12. Psathyrella agaves (Maire) Konrad & Maubl. (1949)
13. Psathyrella agrariella (G.F. Atk.) A.H. Sm. (1972)
14. Psathyrella agrestis A.H. Sm. (1972)
15. Psathyrella alachuana Murrill (1943)
16. Psathyrella alaskaensis A.H. Sm. (1972)
17. Psathyrella albanyensis A.H. Sm. (1972)
18. Psathyrella albescens Hesler & A.H. Sm. (1972)
19. Psathyrella albida Massee (1899)
20. Psathyrella alboalutacea A.H. Sm. (1950)
21. Psathyrella albocapitata Dennis (1961)
22. Psathyrella albocinerascens A.H. Sm. (1972)
23. Psathyrella albocinnamomea A.H. Sm. (1972)
24. Psathyrella albofloccosa Arenal, M. Villarreal & Esteve-Rav. (2003)
25. Psathyrella alluviana A.H. Sm. (1972)
26. Psathyrella almerensis Kits van Wav. (1985)
27. Psathyrella alnicola A.H. Sm. (1972)
28. Psathyrella alpina T. Bau & J.Q. Yan (2018)
29. Psathyrella amara J.E. Ward & J.C. McDonald (1965)
30. Psathyrella amarella A.H. Sm. (1972)
31. Psathyrella amarescens Arnolds (2003)
32. Psathyrella amaura (Berk. & Broome) Pegler (1986)
33. Psathyrella ambusta A.H. Sm. (1972)
34. Psathyrella ammiratii A.H. Sm. (1972)
35. Psathyrella amygdalinospora T. Bau & J.Q. Yan (2021)
36. Psathyrella ammophila (Durieu & Lév.) P.D. Orton (1960)
37. Psathyrella anaglaea (Maire) Maire & Werner (1938)
38. Psathyrella anguina (V. Brig.) Sacc. & Traverso (1911)
39. Psathyrella angusticeps Peck (1906)
40. Psathyrella angusticystis A.H. Sm. (1972)
41. Psathyrella annulata A.H. Sm. (1972)
42. Psathyrella annulosa Singer (1973)
43. Psathyrella apora Singer (1969)
44. Psathyrella aquatica J.L. Frank, Coffan & D. Southw. (2010)
45. Psathyrella araguana Dennis (1961)
46. Psathyrella arenosa Örstadius & E. Larss. (2015)
47. Psathyrella arenulina (Peck) A.H. Sm. (1972)
48. Psathyrella argentata A.H. Sm. (1972)
49. Psathyrella argentina Speg. (1898)
50. Psathyrella argillacea A.H. Sm. (1972)
51. Psathyrella argillospora Singer (1973)
52. Psathyrella aristeguietana Dennis (1961)
53. Psathyrella armeniaca Pegler (1977)
54. Psathyrella artemisiae (Pass.) Konrad & Maubl. (1949)
55. Psathyrella ascarioides L. Freire & J.M. Losa (1977)
56. Psathyrella aspenensis Mitchel & A.H. Sm. (1978)
57. Psathyrella asperospora (Cleland) Guzmán, Bandala & Montoya (1991)
58. Psathyrella atomata (Fr.) Quél. (1872)
59. Psathyrella atomatoides (Peck) A.H. Sm. (1972)
60. Psathyrella atricastanea (Murrill) A.H. Sm. (1972)
61. Psathyrella atrifolia (Peck) A.H. Sm. (1941)
62. Psathyrella atrospora A.H. Sm. (1972)
63. Psathyrella atroumbonata Pegler (1966)
64. Psathyrella australis (Murrill) A.H. Sm. (1972)
65. Psathyrella avellaneifolia A.H. Sm. (1972)
66. Psathyrella avilana Dennis (1961)
67. Psathyrella badia Kits van Wav. (1987)
68. Psathyrella badiovestita P.D. Orton (1960)
69. Psathyrella baileyi A.H. Sm. (1972)
70. Psathyrella bambra Grgur. (1997)
71. Psathyrella baragensis A.H. Sm. (1972)
72. Psathyrella barlowiana A.H. Sm. (1972)
73. Psathyrella barrowsii A.H. Sm. (1972)
74. Psathyrella bartholomaei Peck (1895)
75. Psathyrella basii Kits van Wav. (1985)
76. Psathyrella battarrae (Fr.) Konrad & Maubl. (1949)
77. Psathyrella bernardiana Dennis (1961)
78. Psathyrella bernhardii Kits van Wav. (1987)
79. Psathyrella berolinensis Ew. Gerhardt (1978)
80. Psathyrella betulina Peck (1907)
81. Psathyrella bifrons (Berk.) A.H. Sm. (1941)
82. Psathyrella bigelowii A.H. Sm. (1972)
83. Psathyrella bipellis (Quél.) A.H. Sm. (1946)
84. Psathyrella boninensis (S. Ito & S. Imai) S. Ito (1959)
85. Psathyrella borealis A.H. Sm. (1972)
86. Psathyrella boreifasciculata Kytöv. & Liimat. (2014)
87. Psathyrella boulderensis A.H. Sm. (1972)
88. Psathyrella brachycystis A.H. Sm. (1972)
89. Psathyrella brevipes (Murrill) A.H. Sm. (1972)
90. Psathyrella brooksii A.H. Sm. (1972)
91. Psathyrella brunnescens A.H. Sm. (1972)
92. Psathyrella byssina (Murrill) A.H. Sm. (1972)
93. Psathyrella calcarea (Romagn.) M.M. Moser (1978)
94. Psathyrella calvinii A.H. Sm. (1972)
95. Psathyrella campestris (Earle) A.H. Sm. (1972)
96. Psathyrella camphorata A.H. Sm. (1972)
97. Psathyrella canadensis A.H. Sm. (1972)
98. Psathyrella candidissima A.H. Sm. (1950)
99. Psathyrella capitatocystis Kits van Wav. (1987)
100. Psathyrella caput-medusae (Fr.) Konrad & Maubl. (1949)
101. Psathyrella carbonaria Velen. (1947)
102. Psathyrella carinthiaca Voto (2011)
103. Psathyrella carminei Örstadius & E. Larss. (2015)
104. Psathyrella carolinensis A.H. Sm. (1972)
105. Psathyrella casca (Fr.) Konrad & Maubl. (1949)
106. Psathyrella cascadensis A.H. Sm. (1972)
107. Psathyrella cascoides A. Melzer, Karich & Wächter (2018)
108. Psathyrella castaneicolor Murrill (1922)
109. Psathyrella castaneidisca (Murrill) A.H. Sm. (1972)
110. Psathyrella catervata (Massee) P.D. Orton (1960)
111. Psathyrella cheyennensis A.H. Sm. (1972)
112. Psathyrella chilensis Speg. (1921)
113. Psathyrella chiloensis Singer (1969)
114. Psathyrella citerinii Eyssart. (2004)
115. Psathyrella citrinovelata A.H. Sm. (1972)
116. Psathyrella cladii-marisci Sicoli, N.G. Passal., De Giuseppe, Palermo, Pellegrino, D. Deschuyteneer & Voto (2022)
117. Psathyrella clivensis (Berk. & Broome) Rezende-Pinto (1943)
118. Psathyrella cloverae A.H. Sm. (1972)
119. Psathyrella cokeri (Murrill) A.H. Sm. (1972)
120. Psathyrella coloradensis A.H. Sm. (1972)
121. Psathyrella columbiana K.A. Harrison & A.H. Sm. (1972)
122. Psathyrella comata (G.F. Atk.) A.H. Sm. (1972)
123. Psathyrella communis A.H. Sm. (1972)
124. Psathyrella complutensis Heykoop & G. Moreno (2015)
125. Psathyrella condensa (Berk.) Manjula (1983)
126. Psathyrella conferta Eyssart. & Chiaffi (2004)
127. Psathyrella confertissima (G.F. Atk.) A.H. Sm. (1941)
128. Psathyrella conica T. Bau & J.Q. Yan (2018)
129. Psathyrella conissans (Peck) A.H. Sm. (1972)
130. Psathyrella connata Kits van Wav. (1985)
131. Psathyrella coprinoceps (Berk. & M.A. Curtis) Dennis (1970)
132. Psathyrella coprinoides A. Delannoy, Chiaffi, Courtec. & Eyssart. (2002)
133. Psathyrella cordispora Natarajan & Raman (1983)
134. Psathyrella cordobaensis A.H. Sm. (1972)
135. Psathyrella cornifericystis A.H. Sm. (1972)
136. Psathyrella corrugis (Pers.) Konrad & Maubl. (1949)
137. Psathyrella corticalis Raithelh. (1985)
138. Psathyrella cortinarioides P.D. Orton (1960)
139. Psathyrella cotonea (Quél.) Konrad & Maubl. (1949)
140. Psathyrella crassulistipes A.H. Sm. (1972)
141. Psathyrella crenulata A.H. Sm. (1972)
142. Psathyrella crinipellis Singer (1973)
143. Psathyrella cubensis Murrill (1918)
144. Psathyrella cuspidata A.H. Sm. (1941)
145. Psathyrella cystidiosa (Peck) A.H. Sm. (1972)
146. Psathyrella cystoindica Voto (2020)
147. Psathyrella debilis Peck (1896)
148. Psathyrella deceptiva A.H. Sm. (1972)
149. Psathyrella delicatella A.H. Sm. (1972)
150. Psathyrella delineata (Peck) A.H. Sm. (1941)
151. Psathyrella dennyensis Kits van Wav. (1987)
152. Psathyrella depauperata A.H. Sm. (1972)
153. Psathyrella deserticola A.H. Sm. (1972)
154. Psathyrella diabolica A.H. Sm. (1972)
155. Psathyrella dichroma (Berk. & M.A. Curtis) A.H. Sm. (1972)
156. Psathyrella dicrani (A.E. Jansen) Kits van Wav. (1985)
157. Psathyrella directa A.H. Sm. (1972)
158. Psathyrella distans A.H. Sm. (1972)
159. Psathyrella distantifolia Murrill (1922)
160. Psathyrella duchesnayensis A.H. Sm. (1972)
161. Psathyrella dunarum Kits van Wav. (1985)
162. Psathyrella dunensis Kits van Wav. (1985)
163. Psathyrella duplicata A.H. Sm. (1972)
164. Psathyrella earlei Murrill (1918)
165. Psathyrella echinata (Cleland) Grgur. (1997)
166. Psathyrella echiniceps (G.F.Atk.) A.H.Sm. (1972)
167. Psathyrella effibulata Örstadius & E. Ludw. (1997)
168. Psathyrella elegans (Romagn.) Bon (1983)
169. Psathyrella ellenae A.H. Sm. (1972)
170. Psathyrella elliptispora A.H. Sm. (1972)
171. Psathyrella elongatipes (C.S. Parker) A.H. Sm. (1972)
172. Psathyrella elwhaensis A.H. Sm. (1972)
173. Psathyrella emmetensis A.H. Sm. (1972)
174. Psathyrella ephemera A.H. Sm. (1972)
175. Psathyrella epimyces (Peck) A.H. Sm. (1972)
176. Psathyrella equina A.H. Sm. (1972)
177. Psathyrella erinensis Dennis (1970)
178. Psathyrella euryspora (A. Karich, E. Büttner & R. Ullrich) Voto (2022)
179. Psathyrella euthygramma (Berk. & M.A. Curtis) Dennis (1961)
180. Psathyrella excelsa (Malençon) Fouchier (1995)
181. Psathyrella fagetophila Örstadius & Enderle (1996)
182. Psathyrella fagetorum A.H. Sm. (1972)
183. Psathyrella falklandica Cotton (1915)
184. Psathyrella fallax A.H. Sm. (1972)
185. Psathyrella fascicularis Singer (1978)
186. Psathyrella fatiscens A.H. Sm. (1972)
187. Psathyrella fatua (Fr.) Konrad & Maubl. (1949)
188. Psathyrella fennoscandica Örstadius & E. Larss. (2015)
189. Psathyrella ferruginea A.H. Sm. (1972)
190. Psathyrella ferrugipes A.H. Sm. (1972)
191. Psathyrella fibrillosa (Pers.) Maire (1938)
192. Psathyrella fibrillosipes A.H. Sm. (1972)
193. Psathyrella filamentosa A.H. Sm. (1972)
194. Psathyrella filopes Velen. (1947)
195. Psathyrella fimbriata (A.M. Young) Ew. Gerhardt (1996)
196. Psathyrella fimiseda Örstadius & E. Larss. (2008)
197. Psathyrella flagelliformis Raithelh. (1986)
198. Psathyrella flexispora T.J. Wallace & P.D. Orton (1960)
199. Psathyrella flexuosipes A.H. Sm. (1972)
200. Psathyrella flocculosa (Earle) A.H. Sm. (1972)
201. Psathyrella floridana (Murrill) A.H. Sm. (1972)
202. Psathyrella floriforgmis (Hauskn.) Voto (2022)
203. Psathyrella fontinalis A.H. Sm. (1972)
204. Psathyrella fragilis Earle (1902)
205. Psathyrella fragrans A.H. Sm. (1972)
206. Psathyrella franklinii A.H. Sm. (1972)
207. Psathyrella fraxinophila A.H. Sm. (1972)
208. Psathyrella frustulenta (Fr.) A.H. Sm. (1941)
209. Psathyrella fuegiana E. Horak (1967)
210. Psathyrella fulva A.H. Sm. (1972)
211. Psathyrella fulvescens (Romagn.) M.M. Moser ex A.H. Sm. (1972)
212. Psathyrella fulvobrunnea A.H. Sm. (1972)
213. Psathyrella fulvoumbrina A.H. Sm. (1972)
214. Psathyrella fusca (J.E. Lange) A. Pearson (1952)
215. Psathyrella fuscifolia (Peck) A.H. Sm. (1972)
216. Psathyrella fuscospora A.H. Sm. (1972)
217. Psathyrella galericolor A.H. Sm. (1972)
218. Psathyrella galerinoides A.H. Sm. (1972)
219. Psathyrella galeroides Romagn. (1986)
220. Psathyrella georgiana A.H. Sm. (1972)
221. Psathyrella glandispora Pegler (1966)
222. Psathyrella glaucescens Dennis (1961)
223. Psathyrella globosivelata Gröger (1986)
224. Psathyrella gordonii (Berk. & Broome) A. Pearson & Dennis (1948)
225. Psathyrella gracillima Peck (1896)
226. Psathyrella granulosa Arnolds (2003)
227. Psathyrella grasmerensis Trueblood & A.H. Sm. (1972)
228. Psathyrella grisea Murrill (1918)
229. Psathyrella griseifolia A.H. Sm. (1972)
230. Psathyrella griseoalba Z.S. Bi (1985)
231. Psathyrella griseoatomata Herp. (1912)
232. Psathyrella griseola A. Pearson (1950)
233. Psathyrella griseopallida Thiers & A.H. Sm. (1972)
234. Psathyrella gruberi A.H. Sm. (1972)
235. Psathyrella gyroflexa (Fr.) Konrad & Maubl. (1949)
236. Psathyrella harrisonii A.H. Sm. (1972)
237. Psathyrella hellebosensis D. Deschuyteneer & A. Melzer (2017)
238. Psathyrella helobia (Kalchbr.) Maire (1937)
239. Psathyrella hesleri A.H. Sm. (1972)
240. Psathyrella hesleriaffinis Singer (1978)
241. Psathyrella heterocystis A.H. Sm. (1972)
242. Psathyrella hirta Peck (1898)
243. Psathyrella hispida Heinem. (1942)
244. Psathyrella hololanigera (G.F. Atk.) A.H. Sm. (1972)
245. Psathyrella horakiana Raithelh. (1990)
246. Psathyrella hortensis A.H. Sm. (1972)
247. Psathyrella hoseneyae A.H. Sm. (1972)
248. Psathyrella houghtonensis A.H. Sm. (1972)
249. Psathyrella huronensis A.H. Sm. (1972)
250. Psathyrella hydrophiloides Kits van Wav. (1982)
251. Psathyrella hymenocephala (Peck) A.H. Sm. (1941)
252. Psathyrella hypsipus (Fr.) Konrad & Maubl. (1949)
253. Psathyrella ichnusae Örstadius, Contu, E. Larss. & Vizzini (2015)
254. Psathyrella idahoensis A.H. Sm. (1972)
255. Psathyrella imleriana Volders (1997)
256. Psathyrella immaculata E. Horak & Griesser (1987)
257. Psathyrella impexa (Romagn.) Bon (1983)
258. Psathyrella incerta (Sacc.) A.H. Sm. (1972)
259. Psathyrella incondita A.H. Sm. (1972)
260. Psathyrella incrustans A.H. Sm. (1972)
261. Psathyrella indecorosa A.H. Sm. (1972)
262. Psathyrella inflatocystis A.H. Sm. (1972)
263. Psathyrella insignis A.H. Sm. (1946)
264. Psathyrella intermedia (Peck) A.H. Sm. (1972)
265. Psathyrella involuta (Romagn.) M.M. Moser (1967)
266. Psathyrella iterata A.H. Sm. (1972)
267. Psathyrella ivoeensis Örstadius (1986)
268. Psathyrella jacobssonii Örstadius (2001)
269. Psathyrella jalapensis (Murrill) A.H. Sm. (1972)
270. Psathyrella janauariensis Singer (1989)
271. Psathyrella jilinensis T. Bau & J.Q. Yan (2018)
272. Psathyrella katmaiensis V.L. Wells, Kempton & A.H. Sm. (1972)
273. Psathyrella kauffmanii A.H. Sm. (1972)
274. Psathyrella kellermanii (Peck) Singer (1959)
275. Psathyrella kitsiana Örstadius (1986)
276. Psathyrella kodaikanalensis Natarajan & Raman (1983)
277. Psathyrella koreana Seok & Yang S. Kim (2010)
278. Psathyrella lactobrunnescens A.H. Sm. (1972)
279. Psathyrella lacuum Huijsman (1955)
280. Psathyrella laeta A.H. Sm. (1972)
281. Psathyrella laevissima (Romagn.) Singer (1969)
282. Psathyrella lanatipes A.H. Sm. (1972)
283. Psathyrella langei (Malençon) Contu (2007)
284. Psathyrella lanuginosa A.H. Sm. (1972)
285. Psathyrella laricina A.H. Sm. (1972)
286. Psathyrella lateritia Velen. (1939)
287. Psathyrella latispora A.H. Sm. (1972)
288. Psathyrella laurentiana A.H. Sm. (1972)
289. Psathyrella lauricola A.H. Sm. & Hesler (1946)
290. Psathyrella lepidotoides A.H. Sm. (1972)
291. Psathyrella leucostigma Peck (1895)
292. Psathyrella liciosae Contu & Pacioni (1998)
293. Psathyrella lignatilis Singer (1989)
294. Psathyrella ligulata A.H. Sm. (1972)
295. Psathyrella lilaceogrisea A.H. Sm. (1972)
296. Psathyrella lilliputana Örstadius & E. Larss. (2015)
297. Psathyrella limicola (Peck) A.H. Sm. (1972)
298. Psathyrella limophila (Peck) Guzmán (1978)
299. Psathyrella limosa A.H. Sm. (1972)
300. Psathyrella lionella A. Pearson ex Pegler (1996)
301. Psathyrella lithocarpi A.H. Sm. (1972)
302. Psathyrella litoralis Corriol (2014)
303. Psathyrella littenii A.H. Sm. (1972)
304. Psathyrella longicauda P. Karst. (1891)
305. Psathyrella longicystidiata Heykoop & G. Moreno (1998)
306. Psathyrella longicystis A.H. Sm. (1972)
307. Psathyrella longipes (Peck) A.H. Sm. (1941)
308. Psathyrella longistipes A.H. Sm. (1972)
309. Psathyrella longistriata (Murrill) A.H. Sm. (1949)
310. Psathyrella lubrica A.H. Sm. (1972)
311. Psathyrella lucipeta (Berk. & Broome) Pegler (1986)
312. Psathyrella lutensis (Romagn.) Bon (1983)
313. Psathyrella luteovelata A.H. Sm. (1941)
314. Psathyrella lutulenta Esteve-Rav. & M. Villarreal (2002)
315. Psathyrella lyckebodensis Örstadius & E. Larss. (2015)
316. Psathyrella macquariensis Singer (1959)
317. Psathyrella macrocystidiata Arnolds (2003)
318. Psathyrella maculata (C.S. Parker) A.H. Sm. (1972)
319. Psathyrella madeodisca (Peck) A.H. Sm. (1941)
320. Psathyrella madida Örstadius & E. Larss. (2015)
321. Psathyrella magambica Pegler (1977)
322. Psathyrella magnispora Heykoop & G. Moreno (2001)
323. Psathyrella mammifera (Romagn.) Courtec. (2008)
324. Psathyrella marquana A. Melzer, Wächter & Kellner (2018)
325. Psathyrella marthae Singer (1969)
326. Psathyrella mazamensis A.H. Sm. (1972)
327. Psathyrella mazzeri A.H. Sm. (1972)
328. Psathyrella megaspora A.H. Sm. (1972)
329. Psathyrella melanophylla Kits van Wav. (1976)
330. Psathyrella melanophylloides Kits van Wav. (1976)
331. Psathyrella melleipallida A.H. Sm. (1972)
332. Psathyrella membranacea A.H. Sm. (1972)
333. Psathyrella merdicola Örstadius & E. Larss. (2008)
334. Psathyrella mesobromionis Arnolds (2003)
335. Psathyrella mesocystis A.H. Sm. (1972)
336. Psathyrella metuloidophora Singer (1973)
337. Psathyrella mexicana Murrill (1918)
338. Psathyrella microcarpella de Meijer (2009)
339. Psathyrella microcystis A.H. Sm. (1972)
340. Psathyrella microrhiza (Lasch) Konrad & Maubl. (1949)
341. Psathyrella microsperma (Peck) A.H. Sm. (1941)
342. Psathyrella microspora (S. Imai) Hongo (1952)
343. Psathyrella microsporoides Heykoop & G. Moreno (2002)
344. Psathyrella minima Peck (1888)
345. Psathyrella minuta Henn. (1897)
346. Psathyrella minutella (Höhn.) Singer (1986)
347. Psathyrella minutisperma A.H. Sm. (1972)
348. Psathyrella minutissima Kits van Wav. (1987)
349. Psathyrella montgriensis Deschuyteneer, Pérez-De-Greg., J. Carbó, C. Roqué & À. Torrent (2019)
350. Psathyrella monticola A.H. Sm. (1972)
351. Psathyrella mookensis Kits van Wav. (1987)
352. Psathyrella moseri Singer (1969)
353. Psathyrella moshiana Pegler (1977)
354. Psathyrella mucosa Z.S. Bi (1991)
355. Psathyrella mucrocystis A.H. Sm. (1972)
356. Psathyrella multicystidiata Kits van Wav. (1987)
357. Psathyrella multissima (S. Imai) Hongo (1952)
358. Psathyrella murcida (Fr.) Kits van Wav. (1985)
359. Psathyrella muricellata (Singer) Singer (1962)
360. Psathyrella murrillii A.H. Sm. (1972)
361. Psathyrella myceniformis Dennis (1961)
362. Psathyrella mycenoides T. Bau (2018)
363. Psathyrella nahuelbutensis Garrido (1988)
364. Psathyrella naivashaiensis Pegler (1977)
365. Psathyrella nana (Massee) Manjula (1983)
366. Psathyrella nassa (Berk.) Manjula (1983)
367. Psathyrella neotropica A.H. Sm. (1972)
368. Psathyrella nezpercii A.H. Sm. (1972)
369. Psathyrella nigripunctipes W.F. Chiu (1973)
370. Psathyrella nimkeae A.H. Sm. (1972)
371. Psathyrella nitens A.H. Sm. (1972)
372. Psathyrella niveobadia (Romagn.) M.M. Moser (1978)
373. Psathyrella noli-tangere (Fr.) A. Pearson & Dennis (1948)
374. Psathyrella nothomyrciae Singer (1969)
375. Psathyrella oblongispora (C.S. Parker) A.H. Sm. (1941)
376. Psathyrella oboensis Desjardin & B.A. Perry (2016)
377. Psathyrella obscura (Peck) Guzmán (1978)
378. Psathyrella obscurotristis Enderle & M. Wilh. (2008)
379. Psathyrella obtusata (Pers.) A.H. Sm. (1941)
380. Psathyrella ochracea (Romagn.) M.M. Moser ex Kits van Wav. (1976)
381. Psathyrella ochrofulva (A.H. Sm.) Voto, Dovana & Garbel. (2019)
382. Psathyrella ogemawensis A.H. Sm. (1972)
383. Psathyrella olivaceocystis A.H. Sm. (1972)
384. Psathyrella olivaceopallida A.H. Sm. (1972)
385. Psathyrella olympiana A.H. Sm. (1941)
386. Psathyrella opaca (Romagn.) M.M. Moser ex Kits van Wav. (1976)
387. Psathyrella opacipes A.H. Sm. (1972)
388. Psathyrella ophirensis A.H. Sm. (1972)
389. Psathyrella orbicularis (Romagn.) Kits van Wav. (1976)
390. Psathyrella orbitarum (Romagn.) M.M. Moser (1967)
391. Psathyrella oregonensis A.H. Sm. (1972)
392. Psathyrella orizabensis (Murrill) A.H. Sm. (1972)
393. Psathyrella ornatispora M. Villarreal & Esteve-Rav. (2002)
394. Psathyrella ovalispora A.H. Sm. (1972)
395. Psathyrella ovaticystis Pegler (1977)
396. Psathyrella ovatispora A.H. Sm. (1972)
397. Psathyrella ovispora D. Deschuyteneer, Heykoop & G. Moreno (2019)
398. Psathyrella owyheensis A.H. Sm. (1972)
399. Psathyrella pallida A.H. Sm. (1972)
400. Psathyrella pallidispora Dennis (1970)
401. Psathyrella paludosa A.H. Sm. (1972)
402. Psathyrella palustris (Romagn.) M.M. Moser (1978)
403. Psathyrella pampeana Speg. (1898)
404. Psathyrella panaeoloides (Maire) Arnolds (1982)
405. Psathyrella paradoxa A.H. Sm. (1972)
406. Psathyrella parva A.H. Sm. (1972)
407. Psathyrella parvicystis A.H. Sm. (1972)
408. Psathyrella parvifibrillosa A.H. Sm. (1972)
409. Psathyrella parvivelosa A.H. Sm. (1972)
410. Psathyrella patagonica Singer (1969)
411. Psathyrella payettensis A.H. Sm. (1972)
412. Psathyrella pellstonensis A.H. Sm. (1972)
413. Psathyrella pellucidipes (Romagn.) M.M. Moser (1978)
414. Psathyrella pennata (Fr.) A. Pearson & Dennis (1948)
415. Psathyrella perpusilla Kits van Wav. (1987)
416. Psathyrella pertinax (Fr.) Örstadius (2007)
417. Psathyrella pervelata Kits van Wav. (1971)
418. Psathyrella pervelatoides Seok & Yang S. Kim (2010)
419. Psathyrella petasiformis Murrill (1922)
420. Psathyrella phaeocystidiata Singer (1973)
421. Psathyrella phaseolispora Arnolds (1982)
422. Psathyrella phegophila Romagn. (1985)
423. Psathyrella phyllophila Raithelh. (1974)
424. Psathyrella piceicola A.H. Sm. & Hesler (1946)
425. Psathyrella picta (Romagn.) Romagn. ex Bon (1983)
426. Psathyrella piluliformis (Bull.) P.D. Orton (1969)
427. Psathyrella piluliformoides T. Bau & J.Q. Yan (2021)
428. Psathyrella pinicola A.H. Sm. (1972)
429. Psathyrella pivae Heykoop, G. Moreno & M. Mata (2019)
430. Psathyrella plana (Murrill) A.H. Sm. (1972)
431. Psathyrella platensis Speg. (1898)
432. Psathyrella plumigera (Berk. & M.A. Curtis) A.H. Sm. (1972)
433. Psathyrella polaris Rostr. (1906)
434. Psathyrella polycystidiosa Singer (1969)
435. Psathyrella poonensis Sathe & S.D. Deshp. (1981)
436. Psathyrella populorum Trueblood & A.H. Sm. (1972)
437. Psathyrella potteri A.H. Sm. (1972)
438. Psathyrella praeatomata A.H. Sm. (1972)
439. Psathyrella praecox A.H. Sm. (1972)
440. Psathyrella praelonga A. Pearson (1950)
441. Psathyrella praetenuis A.H. Sm. (1972)
442. Psathyrella pratensis A.H. Sm. (1972)
443. Psathyrella prona (Fr.) Gillet (1878)
444. Psathyrella proxima (Romagn.) Bon (1983)
445. Psathyrella pruinosa Rawla (1991)
446. Psathyrella pruinosipes A.H. Sm. (1972)
447. Psathyrella prunuliformis (Murrill) A.H. Sm. (1972)
448. Psathyrella psammophila A.H. Sm. (1972)
449. Psathyrella pseudocasca (Romagn.) Kits van Wav. (1982)
450. Psathyrella pseudocoronata A.H. Sm. (1972)
451. Psathyrella pseudocorrugata A.H. Sm. (1972)
452. Psathyrella pseudocorrugis (Romagn.) Bon (1983)
453. Psathyrella pseudocotonea A.H. Sm. (1972)
454. Psathyrella pseudofoenisecii A.H. Sm. (1972)
455. Psathyrella pseudofrustulenta A.H. Sm. (1972)
456. Psathyrella pseudofulvescens A.H. Sm. (1972)
457. Psathyrella pseudogordonii Kits van Wav. (1985)
458. Psathyrella pseudogracilis (Romagn.) M.M. Moser (1967)
459. Psathyrella pseudolactea A.H. Sm. (1972)
460. Psathyrella pseudolarga A.H. Sm. (1972)
461. Psathyrella pseudolimicola A.H. Sm. (1972)
462. Psathyrella pseudolongipes A.H. Sm. (1972)
463. Psathyrella pseudoparadoxa V.L. Wells & A.H. Sm. (1972)
464. Psathyrella pseudosenex A.H. Sm. (1972)
465. Psathyrella pseudotrepida A.H. Sm. (1972)
466. Psathyrella pseudovernalis A.H. Sm. (1972)
467. Psathyrella psilocyboides A.H. Sm. (1972)
468. Psathyrella purpureobadia Arnolds (2003)
469. Psathyrella pusilla Pegler (1977)
470. Psathyrella pygmaea (Bull.) Singer (1951)
471. Psathyrella quercicola A.H. Sm. (1972)
472. Psathyrella radicellata Malençon ex Pacioni (1988)
473. Psathyrella rainierensis A.H. Sm. (1972)
474. Psathyrella ramicola A.H. Sm. (1972)
475. Psathyrella rawlae Voto (2020)
476. Psathyrella renispora A.H. Sm. (1972)
477. Psathyrella reticulata (Romagn.) M.M. Moser ex Singer (1969)
478. Psathyrella rhizophorae Singer (1973)
479. Psathyrella rhodospora M.G. Weaver & A.H. Sm. (1972)
480. Psathyrella rhombispora P.-J. Keizer (1993)
481. Psathyrella ridicula Kits van Wav. (1976)
482. Psathyrella rigidipes (Peck) A.H. Sm. (1972)
483. Psathyrella riparia A.H. Sm. (1972)
484. Psathyrella rogersiae Voto, Garbel. & Chiarello (2019)
485. Psathyrella rogueiana A.H. Sm. (1972)
486. Psathyrella romagnesii Kits van Wav. (1972)
487. Psathyrella romellii Örstadius (2007)
488. Psathyrella romseyensis Kits van Wav. (1987)
489. Psathyrella rooseveltiana Murrill (1942)
490. Psathyrella roothaanensis A.H. Sm. (1972)
491. Psathyrella rostellata Örstadius (1986)
492. Psathyrella roystoniae (Earle) Singer (1951)
493. Psathyrella rubescens A.H. Sm. (1972)
494. Psathyrella rubicola A.H. Sm. (1950)
495. Psathyrella rubiginosa A.H. Sm. (1972)
496. Psathyrella ruderaria A.H. Sm. (1972)
497. Psathyrella rudericola A.H. Sm. (1946)
498. Psathyrella rufescens (Petch) Pegler (1986)
499. Psathyrella rufogrisea A.H. Sm. (1972)
500. Psathyrella rugocephala (G.F. Atk.) A.H. Sm. (1972)
501. Psathyrella rugoproxima (C.S. Parker) A.H. Sm. (1972)
502. Psathyrella rugoradiata Hesler & A.H. Sm. (1972)
503. Psathyrella rugulosa A.H. Sm. (1972)
504. Psathyrella rybergii Örstadius & E. Larss. (2015)
505. Psathyrella sabuletorum Örstadius & E. Larss. (2015)
506. Psathyrella saccharinophila (Peck) A.H. Sm. (1972)
507. Psathyrella sachaensis (Singer) Voto (2020)
508. Psathyrella salictaria A.H. Sm. (1972)
509. Psathyrella salina M. Broussal, G. Mir, J. Carbó & M.À. Pérez-De-Gregorio (2018)
510. Psathyrella salmonescens A.H. Sm. (1972)
511. Psathyrella sanjuanensis (A.H. Sm.) Voto, Dovana & Garbel. (2019)
512. Psathyrella saponacea F.H. Møller (1945)
513. Psathyrella scanica Örstadius & E. Larss. (2015)
514. Psathyrella scatophila Örstadius & E. Larss. (2008)
515. Psathyrella scheppingensis Arnolds (2003)
516. Psathyrella scobinacea (Fr.) Konrad & Maubl. (1949)
517. Psathyrella scotospora (Romagn.) Bon (1983)
518. Psathyrella segregis Singer (1989)
519. Psathyrella seminuda A.H. Sm. (1972)
520. Psathyrella senex (Peck) A.H. Sm. (1972)
521. Psathyrella septentrionalis A.H. Sm. (1972)
522. Psathyrella sepulcreti A.H. Sm. (1972)
523. Psathyrella sequoiae Thiers & A.H. Sm. (1972)
524. Psathyrella seymourensis A.H. Sm. (1972)
525. Psathyrella sharonensis A.H. Sm. (1972)
526. Psathyrella siccophila Örstadius & E. Larss. (2015)
527. Psathyrella similis (C.S. Parker) A.H. Sm. (1941)
528. Psathyrella similissima A.H. Sm. (1972)
529. Psathyrella smithii Guzmán (1974)
530. Psathyrella solheimii McKnight & A.H. Sm. (1972)
531. Psathyrella solitaria A.H. Sm. (1972)
532. Psathyrella spadiceogrisea (Schaeff.) Maire (1937)
533. Psathyrella sphaerocystis P.D. Orton (1964)
534. Psathyrella sphaerospora Sacc. (1917)
535. Psathyrella sphagnicola (Maire) J. Favre (1937)
536. Psathyrella spintrigera (Fr.) Konrad & Maubl. (1949)
537. Psathyrella spintrigeroides P.D. Orton (1960)
538. Psathyrella squamosa (P. Karst.) A.H. Sm. (1972)
539. Psathyrella stellata (Romagn.) Romagn. (1983)
540. Psathyrella stellatifurfuracea (S. Ito & S. Imai) S. Ito (1959)
541. Psathyrella stelzeri Raithelh. (1974)
542. Psathyrella stercoraria Örstadius & E. Larss. (2008)
543. Psathyrella stevensonii Murrill (1918)
544. Psathyrella stigmatospora Clémençon (1985)
545. Psathyrella storea (Fr.) Romagn. ex Bon (1983)
546. Psathyrella striatoannulata Heykoop, G. Moreno & M. Mata (2017)
547. Psathyrella stridvalliorum Örstadius & E. Larss. (2015)
548. Psathyrella stuntzii A.H. Sm. (1972)
549. Psathyrella suavissima Ayer (1984)
550. Psathyrella subagraria (G.F. Atk.) A.H. Sm. (1972)
551. Psathyrella subalpina A.H. Sm. (1950)
552. Psathyrella subannulata Raithelh. (1977)
553. Psathyrella subargillacea A.H. Sm. (1972)
554. Psathyrella subaustralis A.H. Sm. (1972)
555. Psathyrella subcacao (T. Bau & J.Q. Yan) Voto (2022)
556. Psathyrella subcaerulea A.H. Sm. (1972)
557. Psathyrella subcaespitosa A.H. Sm. (1972)
558. Psathyrella subcernua (Schulzer) Singer (1944)
559. Psathyrella subcinerascens A.H. Sm. (1972)
560. Psathyrella subconocyboides Singer (1978)
561. Psathyrella subcorticalis Speg. (1922)
562. Psathyrella subdebilis A.H. Sm. (1972)
563. Psathyrella subdisseminata Speg. (1926)
564. Psathyrella subfasciculata A.H. Sm. (1972)
565. Psathyrella subfilipes A.H. Sm. (1972)
566. Psathyrella subhepatica A.H. Sm. (1972)
567. Psathyrella subhyalinispora A.H. Sm. (1972)
568. Psathyrella subincarnata A.H. Sm. (1972)
569. Psathyrella subincerta Z.S. Bi (1987)
570. Psathyrella sublanata A.H. Sm. (1972)
571. Psathyrella sublateritia A.H. Sm. (1972)
572. Psathyrella sublatispora Örstadius, S.-Å. Hanson & E. Larss. (2015)
573. Psathyrella sublongipes A.H. Sm. (1972)
574. Psathyrella sublongispora A.H. Sm. (1972)
575. Psathyrella subminutispora (T. Bau & J.Q. Yan) Voto (2022)
576. Psathyrella submontana A.H. Sm. (1972)
577. Psathyrella subnuda (P. Karst.) A.H. Sm. (1941)
578. Psathyrella subochracea A.H. Sm. (1972)
579. Psathyrella subolivacea A.H. Sm. (1972)
580. Psathyrella subpalustris A.H. Sm. (1972)
581. Psathyrella subpannucioides Courtec. (1985)
582. Psathyrella subpurpurea A.H. Sm. (1972)
583. Psathyrella subradicata A.H. Sm. (1972)
584. Psathyrella subrubella A.H. Sm. (1972)
585. Psathyrella subsericea A.H. Sm. (1972)
586. Psathyrella subsimilissima A.H. Sm. (1972)
587. Psathyrella subspadiceogrisea T. Bau & J.Q. Yan (2017)
588. Psathyrella subsquamulosa A.H. Sm. (1972)
589. Psathyrella substrigosipes A.H. Sm. (1972)
590. Psathyrella subtenacipes A.H. Sm. (1950)
591. Psathyrella subterrestris A.H. Sm. (1972)
592. Psathyrella subtruncatispora A.H. Sm. (1972)
593. Psathyrella subumbrina Kits van Wav. & Örstadius (1986)
594. Psathyrella subvinacea A.H. Sm. (1972)
595. Psathyrella subvolvata A.H. Sm. & Hesler (1946)
596. Psathyrella sumstinei A.H. Sm. (1972)
597. Psathyrella superiorensis A.H. Sm. (1972)
598. Psathyrella tahomensis A.H. Sm. (1972)
599. Psathyrella tahquamenonensis A.H. Sm. (1972)
600. Psathyrella tenacipes A.H. Sm. (1972)
601. Psathyrella tenera Peck (1894)
602. Psathyrella tenuicula (P. Karst.) Örstadius & Huhtinen (1996)
603. Psathyrella tenuis (Murrill) A.H. Sm. (1972)
604. Psathyrella tenuivelata A.H. Sm. (1972)
605. Psathyrella tepeitensis (Murrill) A.H. Sm. (1972)
606. Psathyrella tephrophylla (Romagn.) Bon (1983)
607. Psathyrella terrestris Natarajan (1979)
608. Psathyrella texensis A.H. Sm. (1972)
609. Psathyrella thiersii A.H. Sm. (1972)
610. Psathyrella thomii A.H. Sm. (1972)
611. Psathyrella thujina A.H. Sm. (1972)
612. Psathyrella tierramayorae Voto (2020)
613. Psathyrella tilcariensis Singer (1969)
614. Psathyrella tintinnabula J.Q. Yan (2019)
615. Psathyrella torpens (Fr.) Konrad & Maubl. (1949)
616. Psathyrella trechispora (Petch) Pegler (1986)
617. Psathyrella trepida (Fr.) Gillet (1878)
618. Psathyrella trigonospora Dennis (1970)
619. Psathyrella tristezae Raithelh. (1990)
620. Psathyrella tristis Singer (1969)
621. Psathyrella truncatispora (Murrill) A.H. Sm. (1972)
622. Psathyrella truncatisporoides T. Bau & J.Q. Yan (2021)
623. Psathyrella tsugae A.H. Sm. (1972)
624. Psathyrella tubarioides A.H. Sm. (1972)
625. Psathyrella tumagainensis V.L. Wells & Kempton (1972)
626. Psathyrella turcosomarginata Hoashi (2008)
627. Psathyrella twickelensis Kits van Wav. (1987)
628. Psathyrella uliginicola McKnight & A.H. Sm. (1972)
629. Psathyrella umbonata (Peck) A.H. Sm. (1972)
630. Psathyrella umbrina Kits van Wav. (1982)
631. Psathyrella umbrinescens A.H. Sm. (1972)
632. Psathyrella umbrosa A.H. Sm. (1972)
633. Psathyrella undulatipes A.H. Sm. (1972)
634. Psathyrella usambarensis Pegler (1977)
635. Psathyrella uskensis A.H. Sm. (1972)
636. Psathyrella utahensis McKnight & A.H. Sm. (1972)
637. Psathyrella utriformicystis Seok & Yang S. Kim (2010)
638. Psathyrella variabilissima A.H. Sm. (1972)
639. Psathyrella variata A.H. Sm. (1972)
640. Psathyrella varicosa A. Pearson (1950)
641. Psathyrella varzeae Singer (1989)
642. Psathyrella velatipes A.H. Sm. (1972)
643. Psathyrella velibrunnescens A.H. Sm. (1972)
644. Psathyrella verna A.H. Sm. (1972)
645. Psathyrella vernalis Velen. (1947)
646. Psathyrella vesiculocystis A.H. Sm. (1972)
647. Psathyrella vesiculosa (A.H. Sm.) Voto, Dovana & Garbel. (2019)
648. Psathyrella vesterholtii Örstadius & E. Larss. (2015)
649. Psathyrella vestita (Peck) A.H. Sm. (1941)
650. Psathyrella vialis A.H. Sm. (1972)
651. Psathyrella victorii A.H. Sm. (1972)
652. Psathyrella viloriana Dennis (1961)
653. Psathyrella vinescens A.H. Sm. (1972)
654. Psathyrella vinosofulva P.D. Orton (1960)
655. Psathyrella violaceopallens Contu (1994)
656. Psathyrella vulgaris A.H. Sm. (1972)
657. Psathyrella vyrnwyensis Kits van Wav. (1987)
658. Psathyrella waltersii A.H. Sm. (1972)
659. Psathyrella wapinitaensis Kempton & A.H. Sm. (1972)
660. Psathyrella warrenensis A.H. Sm. (1972)
661. Psathyrella wavereniana M. Marchetti (1993)
662. Psathyrella waverenii Arnolds (1982)
663. Psathyrella wilsonensis A.H. Sm. (1972)
664. Psathyrella yaoundeana Mossebo & Pegler (1998)
