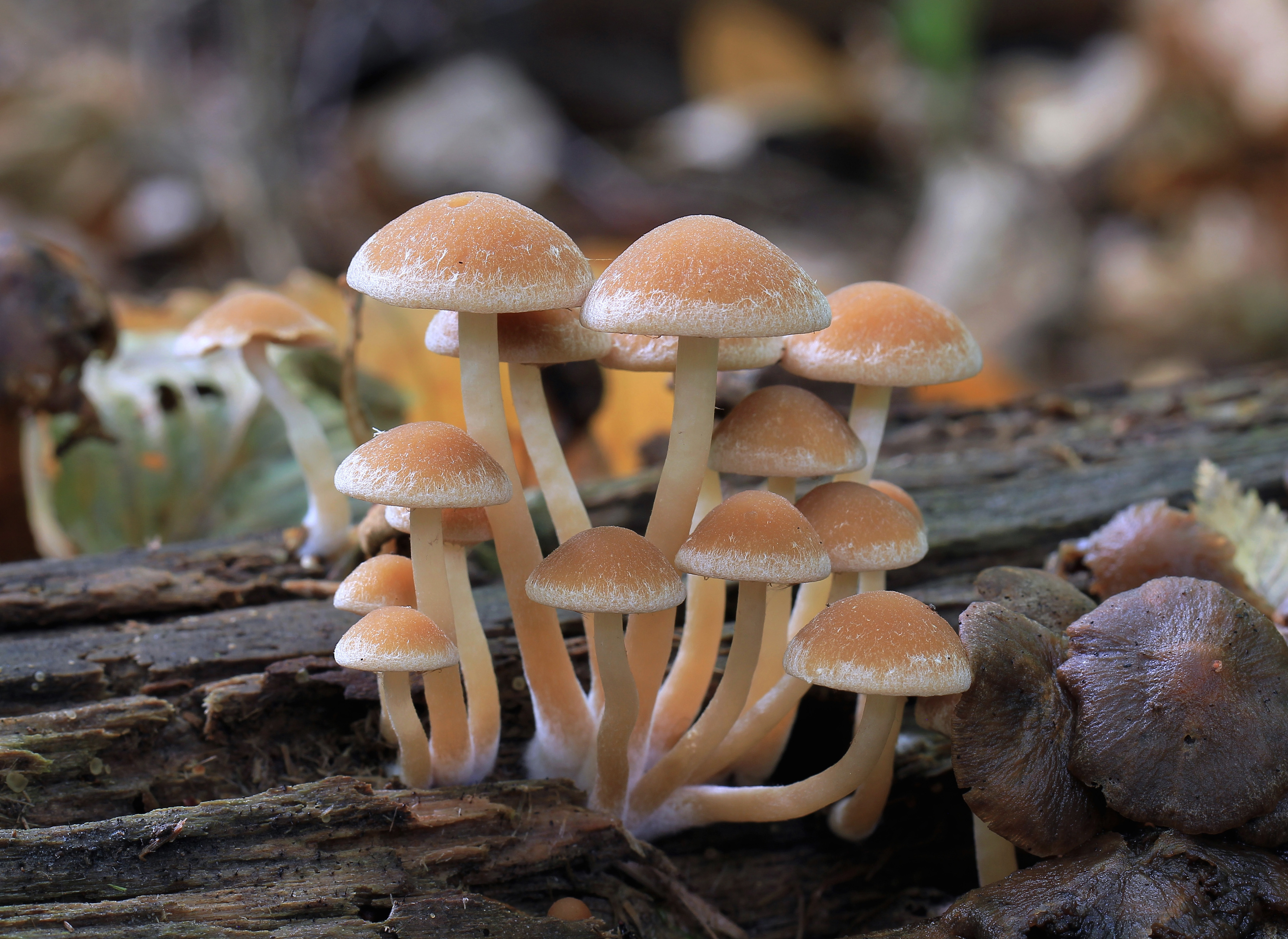

Scientific classification
- Kingdom: Fungi
- Division: Basidiomycota
- Class: Agaricomycetes
- Order: Agaricales
- Family: Psathyrellaceae
- Genus: Psathyrella
- Species: P. piluliformis

Binomial name
- Psathyrella piluliformis (Bull.) P.D.Orton (1969)

Synonyms
- Agaricus piluliformis Bull. (1783); Psathyrella hydrophila (Bull.) Maire

= Psathyrella piluliformis =

Species of fungus

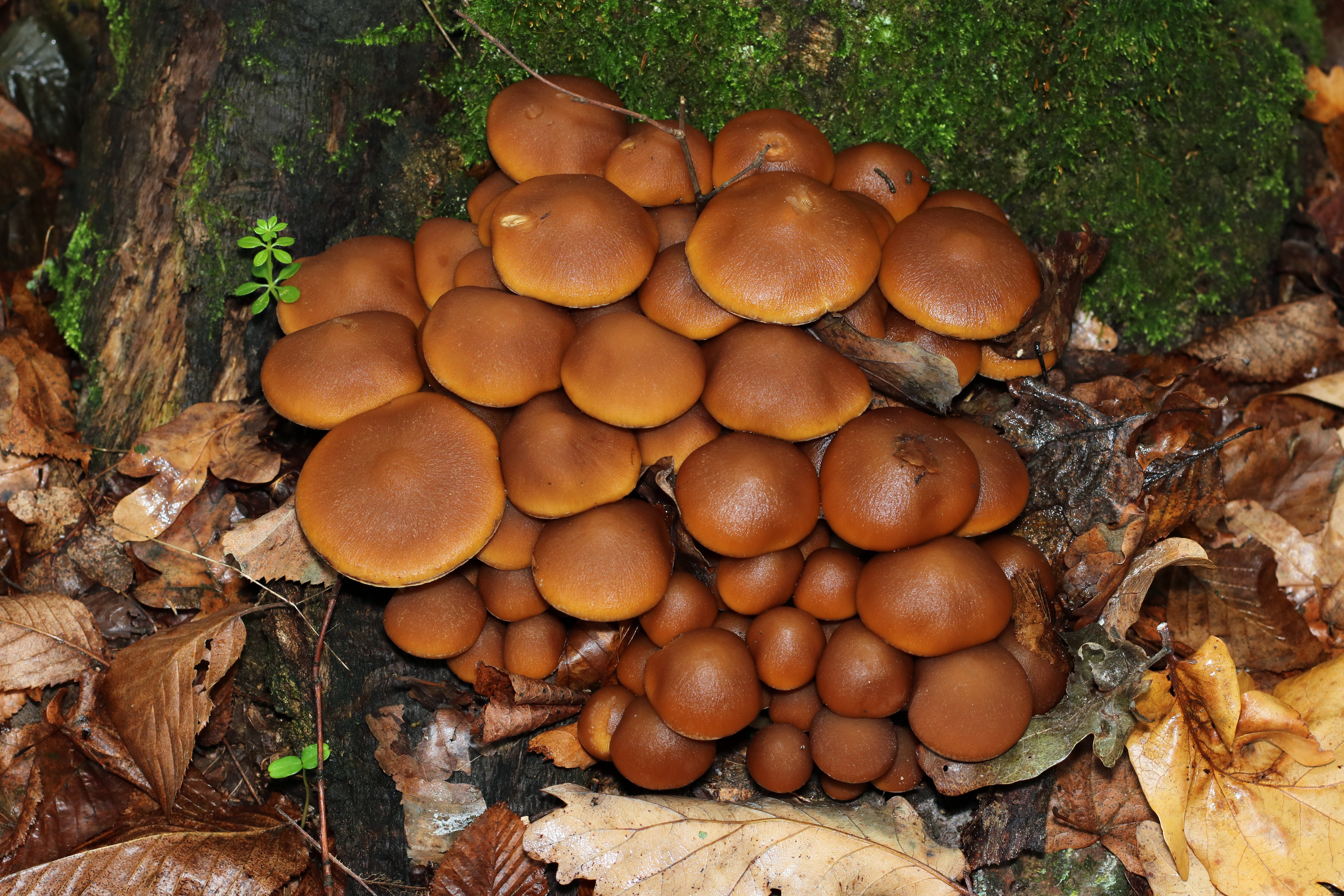
Cluster of mature brittlestem mushrooms (Psathyrella piluliformis), after a rain

Psathyrella piluliformis, commonly known as the clustered brittlestem, is a species of agaric fungus in the family Psathyrellaceae.

== Description ==
It produces fruit bodies (mushrooms) with broadly convex caps measuring 2–5 cm (3/4–2 inches) in diameter. The caps are chestnut to reddish brown, the color fading with age and with dry weather. Fragments of the partial veil may remain on the cap margin, and as a wispy band of hairs on the stipe.

The closely spaced gills have an adnate attachment to the stipe. They are initially tan until the spores mature, when the gills turn dark brown. The stipe is 2–7 cm tall and 3–7 mm wide, white, smooth, hollow, and bulging at the base. The spore print is dark brown, sometimes purplish.

=== Similar species ===
Similar species include Psathyrella carbonicola, P. longipes, P. longistriata, P. multipedata, P. spadicea, and Parasola conopilus.

== Habitat and distribution ==
Fruiting occurs in clusters at the base of hardwood stumps.

== Uses ==
The species is considered edible but of low quality, with fragile flesh and being difficult to identify.

== See also ==
- List of Psathyrella species
