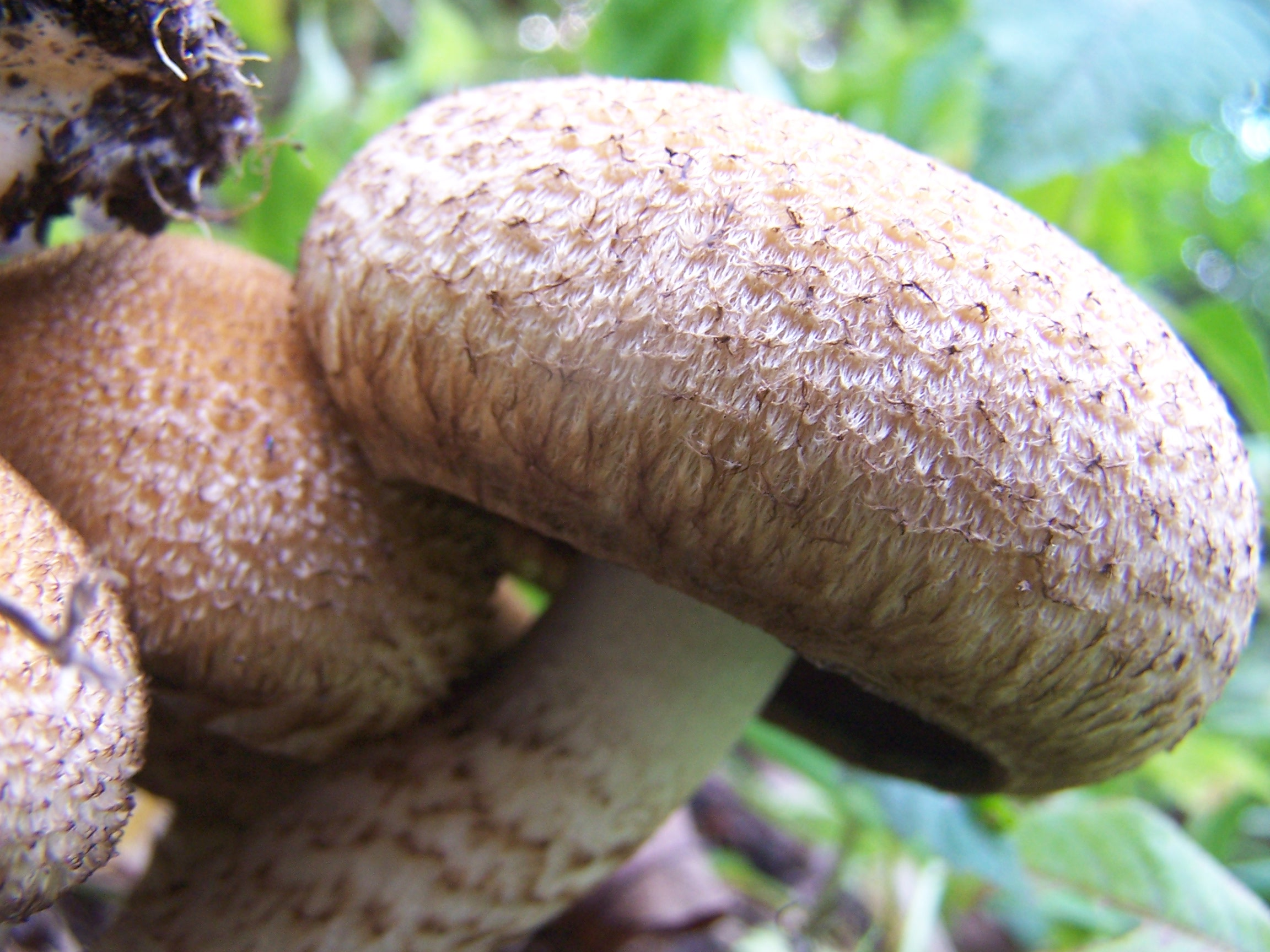

Scientific classification
- Domain: Eukaryota
- Kingdom: Fungi
- Division: Basidiomycota
- Class: Agaricomycetes
- Order: Agaricales
- Family: Psathyrellaceae
- Genus: Psathyrella
- Species: P. echiniceps

Binomial name
- Psathyrella echiniceps (G.F.Atk.) A.H.Sm. (1972)

Synonyms
- Hypholoma echiniceps G.F.Atk. (1909); Drosophila echiniceps (G.F.Atk.) Murrill (1922)

= Psathyrella echiniceps =

Species of fungus

Psathyrella echiniceps is a species of agaric fungus in the family Psathyrellaceae. First described under the name Hypholoma echiniceps by George F. Atkinson in 1909, it was transferred to the genus Psathyrella by Alexander H. Smith in 1972. It is found in the US states of California, Idaho, Maryland, Michigan, New York, Ohio, Oregon, and Washington, where it grows in small groups around hardwood stumps.

== See also ==
- List of Psathyrella species
