= Psathyrella moseri =

Scientific classification
- Domain: Eukaryota
- Kingdom: Fungi
- Division: Basidiomycota
- Class: Agaricomycetes
- Order: Agaricales
- Family: Psathyrellaceae
- Genus: Psathyrella
- Species: P. moseri

Binomial name
- Psathyrella moseri Singer (1969)

Species of fungus

Psathyrella moseri is a species of agaric fungus in the family Psathyrellaceae. Found in Argentina, it was described as new to science by mycologist Rolf Singer in 1969.

== See also ==
- List of Psathyrella species
