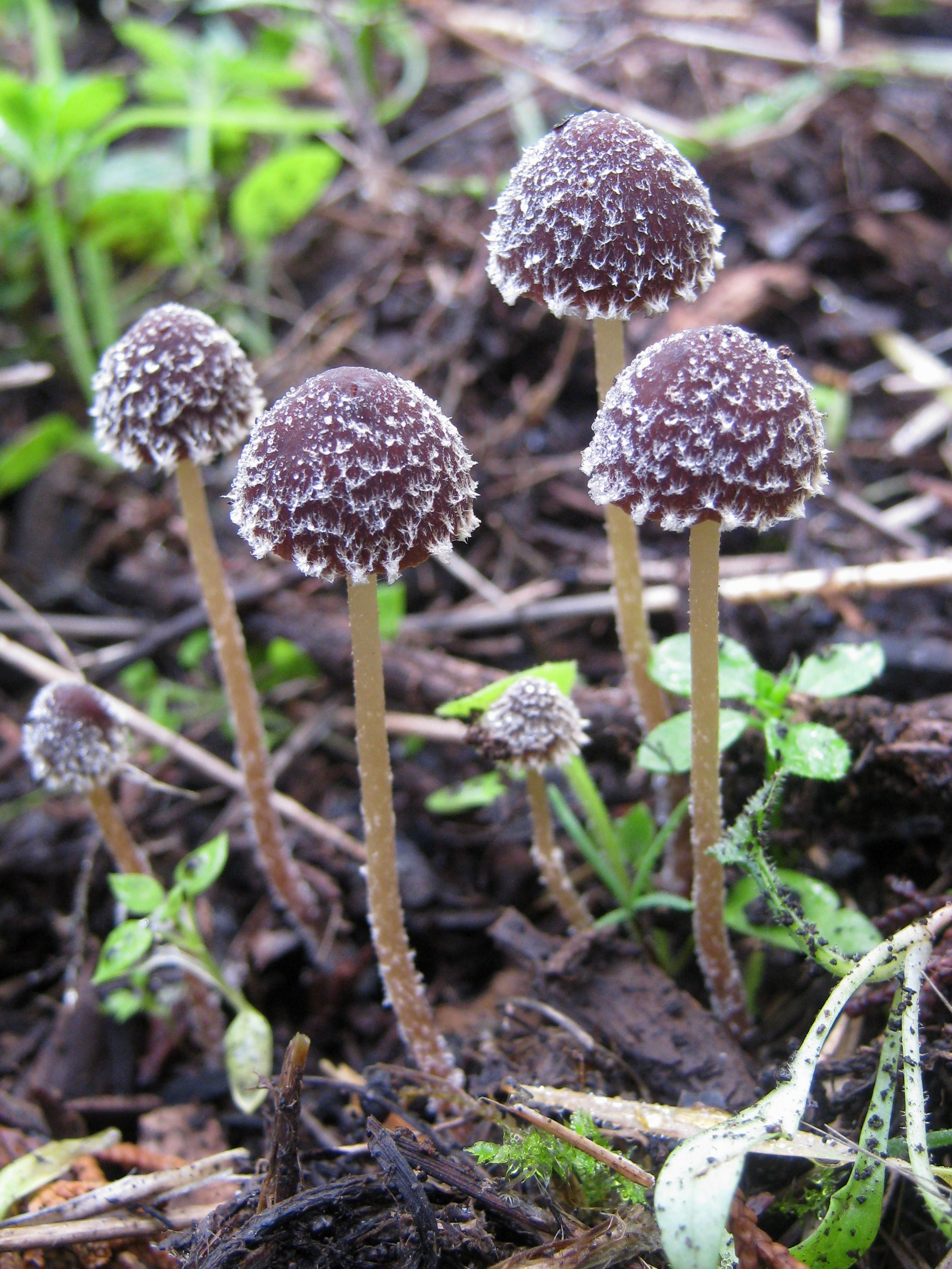

Scientific classification
- Kingdom: Fungi
- Division: Basidiomycota
- Class: Agaricomycetes
- Order: Agaricales
- Family: Psathyrellaceae
- Genus: Psathyrella
- Species: P. vinosofulva

Binomial name
- Psathyrella vinosofulva P.D.Orton (1960)

= Psathyrella vinosofulva =

Species of fungus

Psathyrella vinosofulva is a species of agaric fungus in the family Psathyrellaceae. The species, first described scientifically by P.D.Orton in 1960, is found in Europe. The cap is initially conical to convex before expanded slightly, becoming slightly umbonate, and measures 1.4–2.3 cm (0.6–0.9 in) in diameter. The spores are ellipsoid, have a germ pore, and dimensions of 11–13 by 5.75–7 μm.

== See also ==
- List of Psathyrella species
