= Marie Taylor =

American botanist (1911–1990)

Marie Clark Taylor
- Born: February 28, 1911; Sharpsburg, Pennsylvania
- Died: December 28, 1990 (aged 79); Washington, D.C.
- Education: Howard University; Fordham University
- Spouse: Richard Taylor
- Fields: Botany
- Workplaces: Howard University
- Thesis: The influence of definite photoperiods upon the growth and development of initiated floral primordia (1941)

Marie Clark Taylor (February 16, 1911 – December 28, 1990) was an American botanist, the first woman to earn a science doctorate at Fordham University, and the Head of the Botany Department at Howard University from 1947 to her retirement in 1976. Her research interest was plant photomorphogenesis.

== Early life and education ==
Taylor was born in Sharpsburg, Pennsylvania, on February 16, 1911. After graduating from Dunbar High School in Washington D.C. in 1929, she earned her B.S. (1933) and M.S. (1935, Botany) at Howard University, and in 1941, her Ph.D. at Fordham University, being the first woman of any race to earn a science doctorate at Fordham. For her dissertation, she studied The influence of definite photoperiods upon the growth and development of initiated floral primordia.

== Career ==
She taught at Cardozo High School in the late 1930s and early 1940s, and later started summer science institutes for high school science teachers, introducing new methods for teaching science, such as using light-microscopes to study cells. After serving in the Army Red Cross in New Guinea during World War II, she joined the Botany Department at Howard University in 1945. She succeeded Charles Stewart Parker as Chair of the Botany Department in 1947 at Howard University, a position she held until her retirement in 1976. During her tenure, the department expanded, and Taylor was involved in the design and construction of a new biology building on the Howard University campus. On January 1, 1948, she married Richard Taylor, whom she had met while they were both serving in New Guinea. They had one child, a son, born in 1950.

Taylor also taught a summer science series for the National Science Foundation designed for biology teachers to make use of botanical materials for their courses to illustrate cell life. These summer classes also developed her teaching methods, where she also emphasized microscopes to study living cells. During the mid-1960s, she was requested by President Lyndon B. Johnson to expand her work overseas, bringing her teaching style to an international level.

After her death, an auditorium in the Ernest E. Just Hall at Howard University was named in her honor.

Taylor died on December 28, 1990, at Walter Reed Army Medical Center in Washington, D.C.
