= Psathyrella canadensis =

Scientific classification
- Domain: Eukaryota
- Kingdom: Fungi
- Division: Basidiomycota
- Class: Agaricomycetes
- Order: Agaricales
- Family: Psathyrellaceae
- Genus: Psathyrella
- Species: P. canadensis

Binomial name
- Psathyrella canadensis A.H.Sm. (1972)

Species of fungus

Psathyrella canadensis is a species of agaric fungus in the family Psathyrellaceae. Described as new to science by American mycologist Alexander H. Smith in 1972, it is found in Canada and the United States, where it grows as a saprobe on rotting wood.

== See also ==
- List of Psathyrella species
