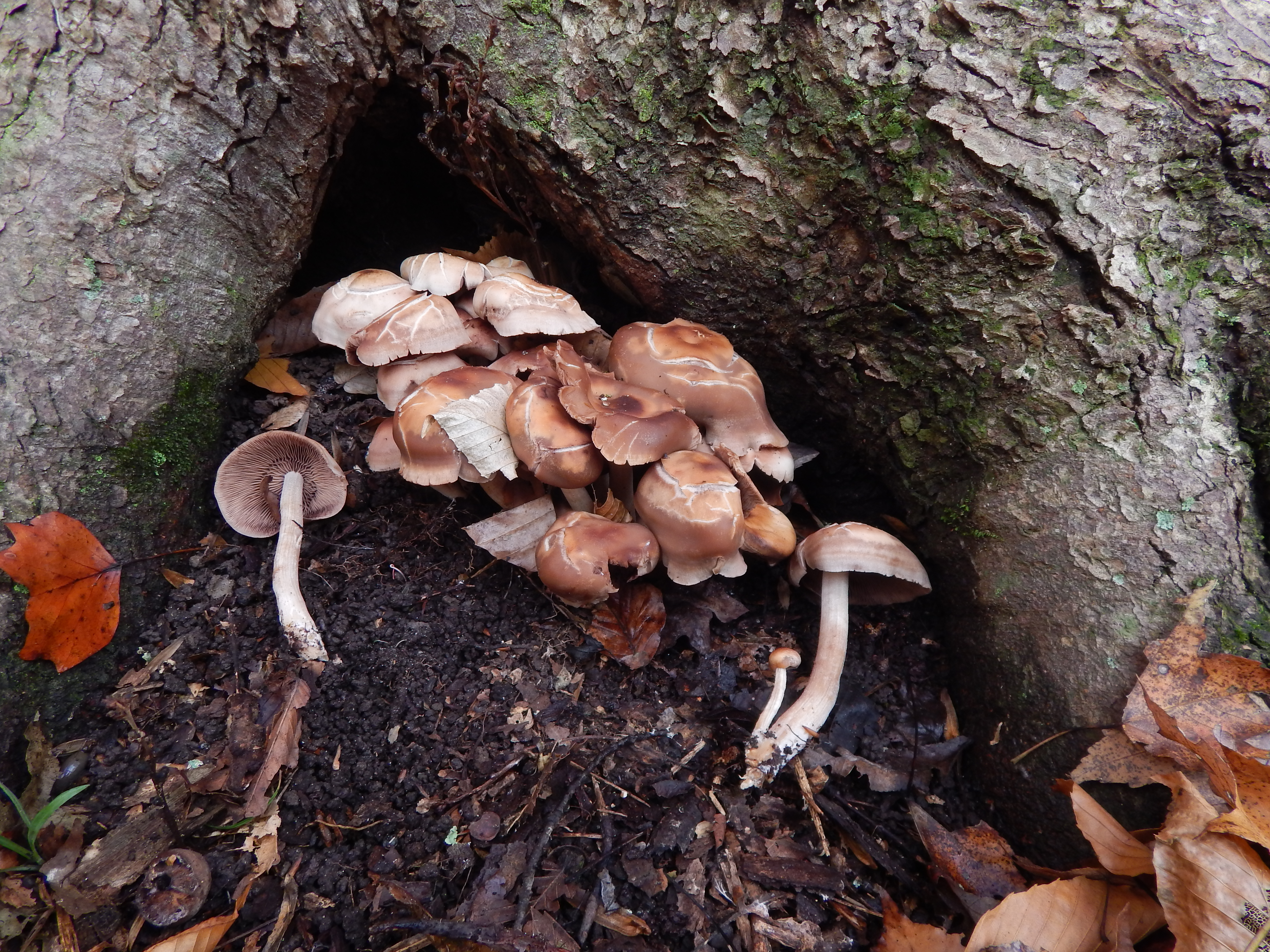
- Homophron spadiceum found in Palmer State Park, Harford County, Maryland

Scientific classification
- Domain: Eukaryota
- Kingdom: Fungi
- Division: Basidiomycota
- Class: Agaricomycetes
- Order: Agaricales
- Family: Psathyrellaceae
- Genus: Homophron (Britzelm.) Örstadius & E.Larss.

= Homophron =

Genus of fungi

Homophron is a genus of fungi belonging to the family Psathyrellaceae.

The species of this genus are found in Europe, Northern America and Australia.

Species:

- Homophron camptopodum (Sacc.) Örstadius & E.Larss.
- Homophron cernuum (Vahl) Örstadius & E.Larss.
- Homophron particularis (Britzelm.) W.B.Cooke
- Homophron spadiceum (P.Kumm.) Örstadius & E.Larss.
