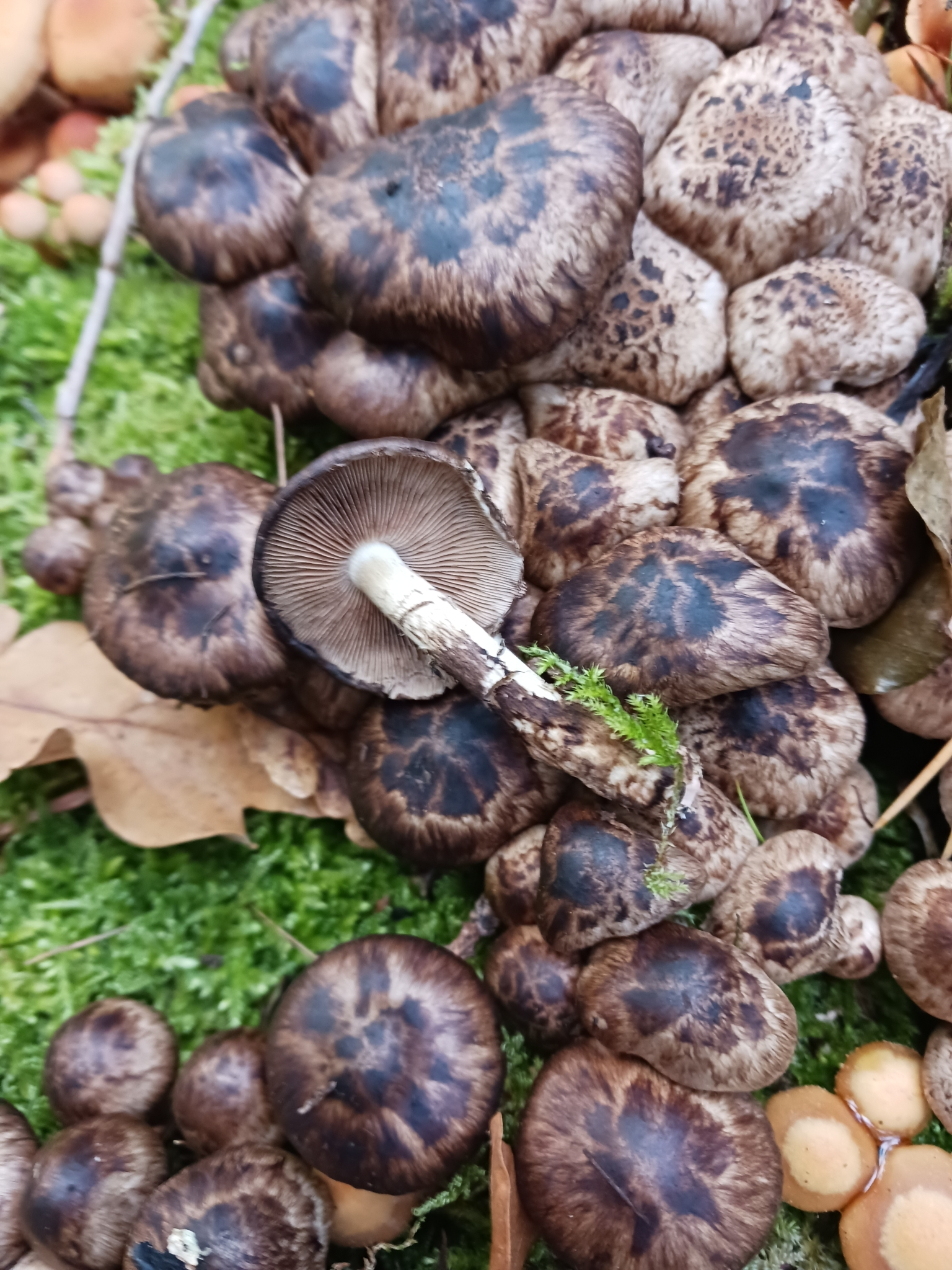

Scientific classification
- Domain: Eukaryota
- Kingdom: Fungi
- Division: Basidiomycota
- Class: Agaricomycetes
- Order: Agaricales
- Family: Psathyrellaceae
- Genus: Psathyrella
- Species: P. maculata

Binomial name
- Psathyrella maculata (C.S. Parker) A.H.Sm. (1972)

= Psathyrella maculata =

Species of fungus

Psathyrella maculata is a species of mushroom in the family Psathyrellaceae. Found most frequently in Europe, it was described as new to science by C.S. Parker and in 1972 given its current name by mycologist Alexander H. Smith.
