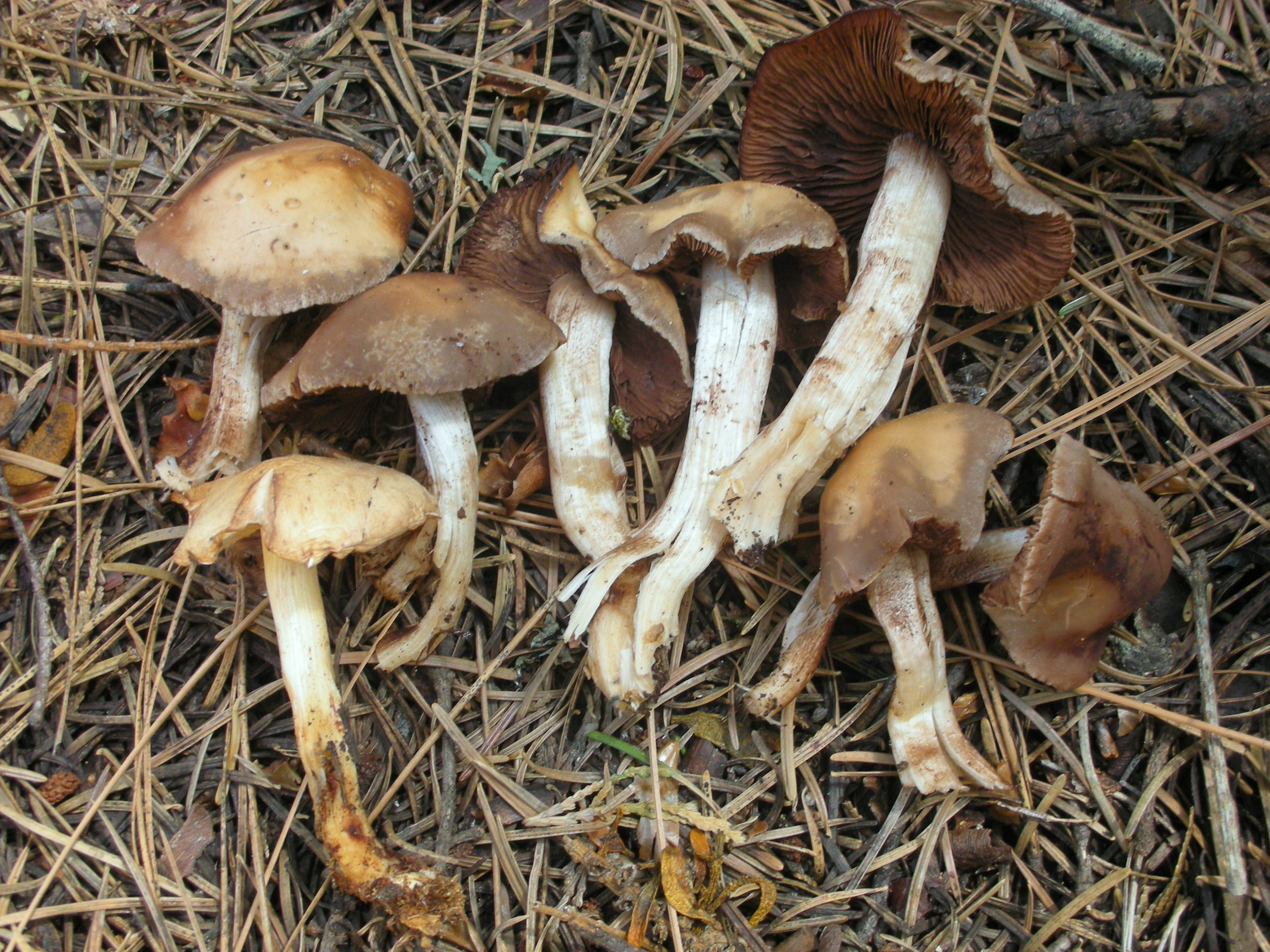

Scientific classification
- Domain: Eukaryota
- Kingdom: Fungi
- Division: Basidiomycota
- Class: Agaricomycetes
- Order: Agaricales
- Family: Psathyrellaceae
- Genus: Psathyrella
- Species: P. spadicea

Binomial name
- Psathyrella spadicea (Schaeff.) Singer (1951)

Synonyms
- Agaricus spadiceus Schaeff. (1783); Homophron spadiceum (P. Kumm.) Örstadius & E. Larss. (2015)

= Psathyrella spadicea =

Species of fungus

Psathyrella spadicea or Homophron spadiceum, commonly known as the chestnut brittlestem, is a species of agaric fungus in the family Psathyrellaceae.

== Taxonomy ==
The fungus was originally described by German mycologist Jacob Christian Schäffer in 1783 as Agaricus spadiceus. Rolf Singer transferred it to the genus Psathyrella in 1951, in which it was classified in the section Spadiceae. In 2015 Örstadius & Larsson recreated the genus Homophron (a name used at the sub-genus level since 1883) for a group of psathyrelloid mushrooms with no veil and with light-coloured spores, and P. spadicea was moved to the new genus.

== Description ==
The brown cap is up to 7 centimetres (2 3/4 in) wide. The tan to brown gills are very close. The stem is up to 8 cm long and 1 cm thick. The spore print is pinkish-brown. Outside of its genus, it can resemble members of Hebeloma.

== Habitat and distribution ==
The species can be found near the base of hardwood trees. In North America, it is found in the Pacific Northwest, northern California, and in the east. It is also found in Europe.

== Uses ==
This mushroom is edible.

== See also ==
- List of Psathyrella species
