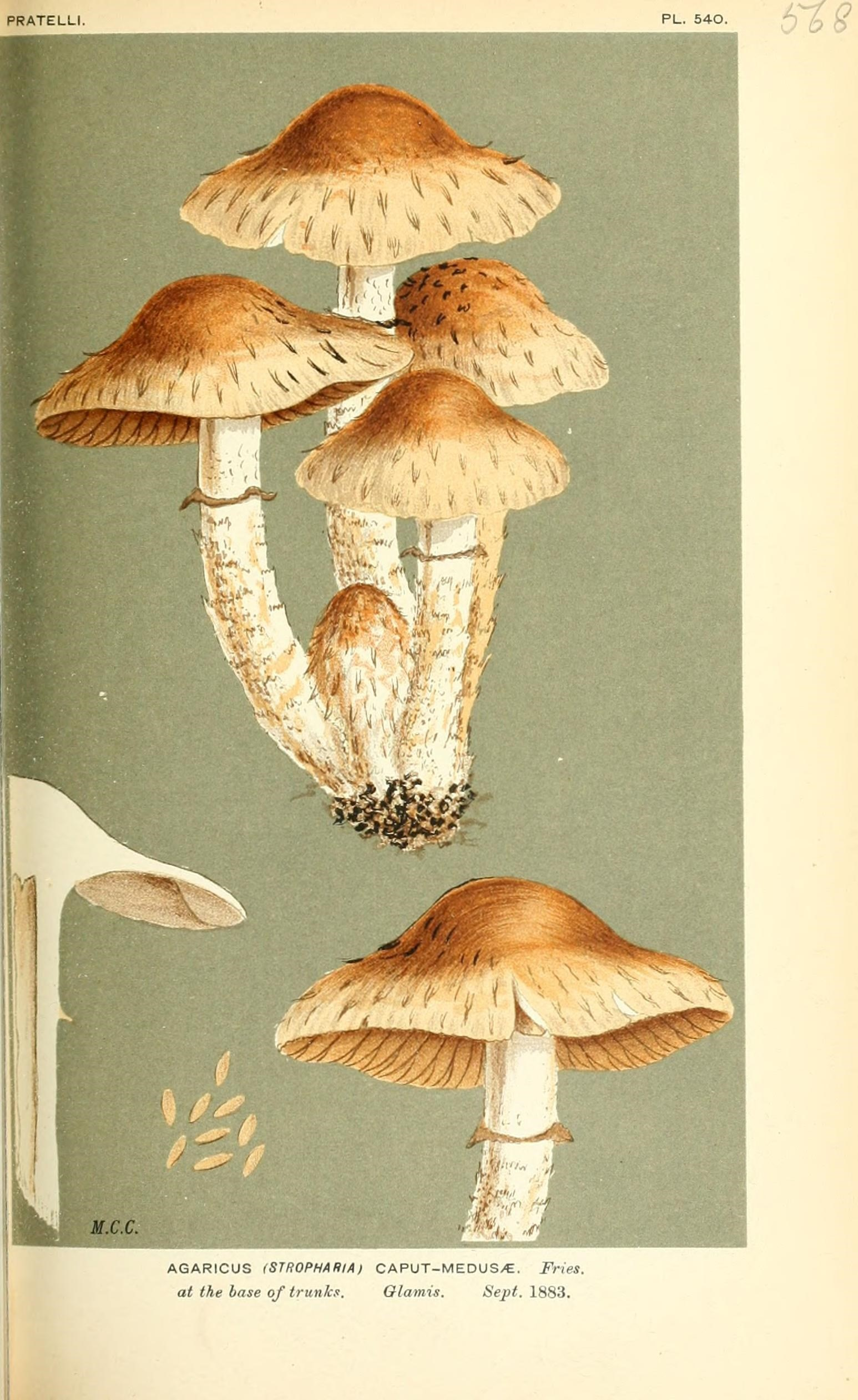

Scientific classification
- Kingdom: Fungi
- Division: Basidiomycota
- Class: Agaricomycetes
- Order: Agaricales
- Family: Psathyrellaceae
- Genus: Psathyrella
- Species: P. caput-medusae

Binomial name
- Psathyrella caput-medusae (Fr.) Konrad & Maubl.

= Psathyrella caput-medusae =

Species of fungus

Psathyrella caput-medusae is a species of fungus belonging to the family Psathyrellaceae.

It is native to Europe and Northern America.
