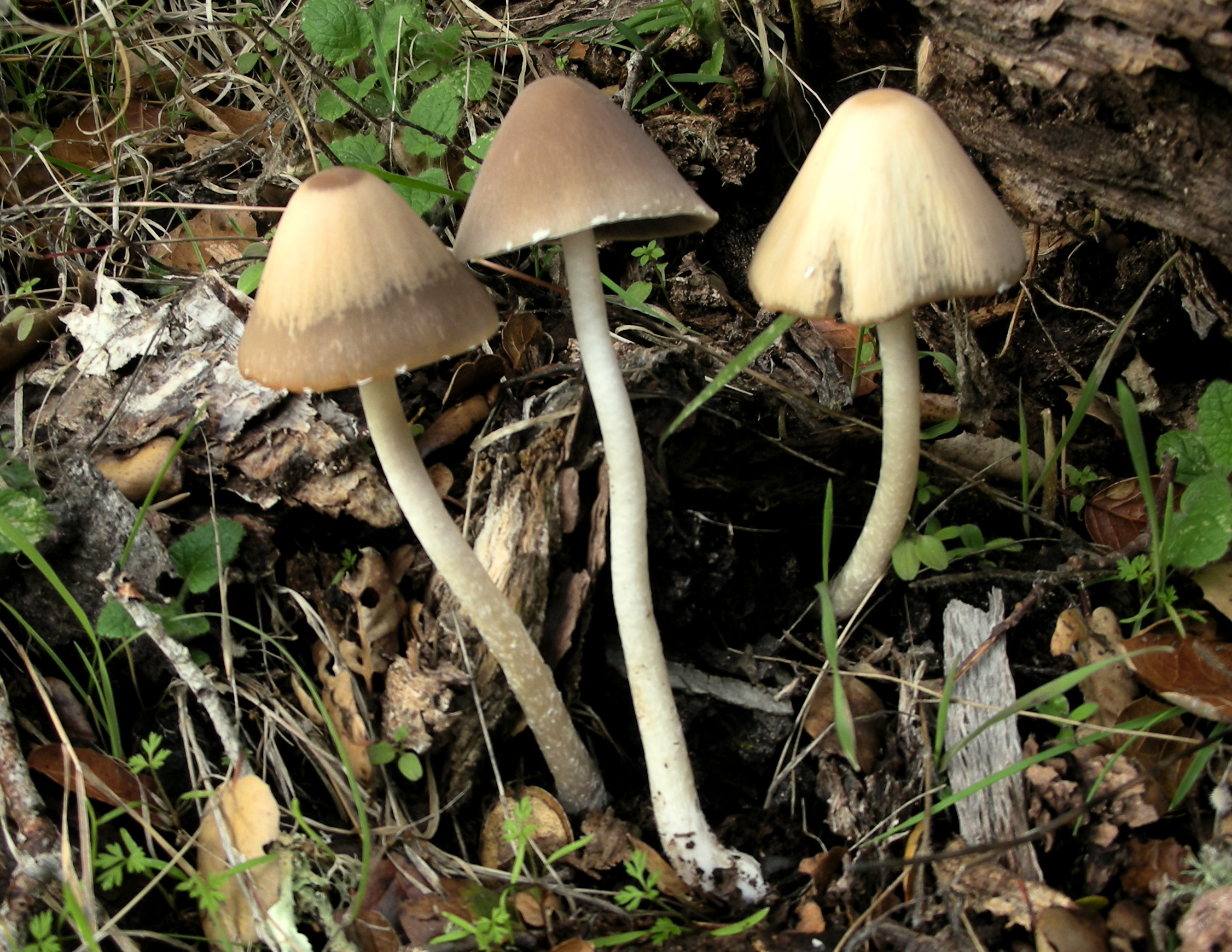

Scientific classification
- Kingdom: Fungi
- Division: Basidiomycota
- Class: Agaricomycetes
- Order: Agaricales
- Family: Psathyrellaceae
- Genus: Psathyrella
- Species: P. longipes

Binomial name
- Psathyrella longipes (Peck) A.H.Sm. (1941)

Synonyms
- Hypholoma longipes Peck (1895)

= Psathyrella longipes =

Species of fungus

Psathyrella longipes
- Mycological characteristics
- Gills on hymenium
- Cap is conical or campanulate
- Hymenium is adnate or seceding
- Spore print is brown to blackish-brown
- Edibility is unknown

Psathyrella longipes, commonly known as the fringecap brittlestem or tall Psathyrella, is a species of agaric fungus in the family Psathyrellaceae and the brittlestem genus, Psathyrella.

== Taxonomy ==
It was originally described as Hypholoma longipes by Charles Horton Peck in 1895; Alexander H. Smith transferred it to Psathyrella in 1941.

== Description ==
The cap is 2.5–4.5 centimetres (1–1 3/4 inches) wide and conical, with a "veil" of whitish fragments which contrast with its basic dull brown colour. As its common name implies, it has a relatively long stipe, 5–12 cm (2–4 3/4 in) long and 2–6 millimetres (1/16–1/4 in) thick.

Microscopy may be needed to reliably distinguish it from related species.

== Distribution and habitat ==
The species has an almost worldwide distribution: reports to iNaturalist show it as present in almost every country in Europe and North Africa, in most states and provinces of North America, in several South American countries, in East Asia and in Australia. It fruits in autumn and early winter.

== See also ==
- List of Psathyrella species
