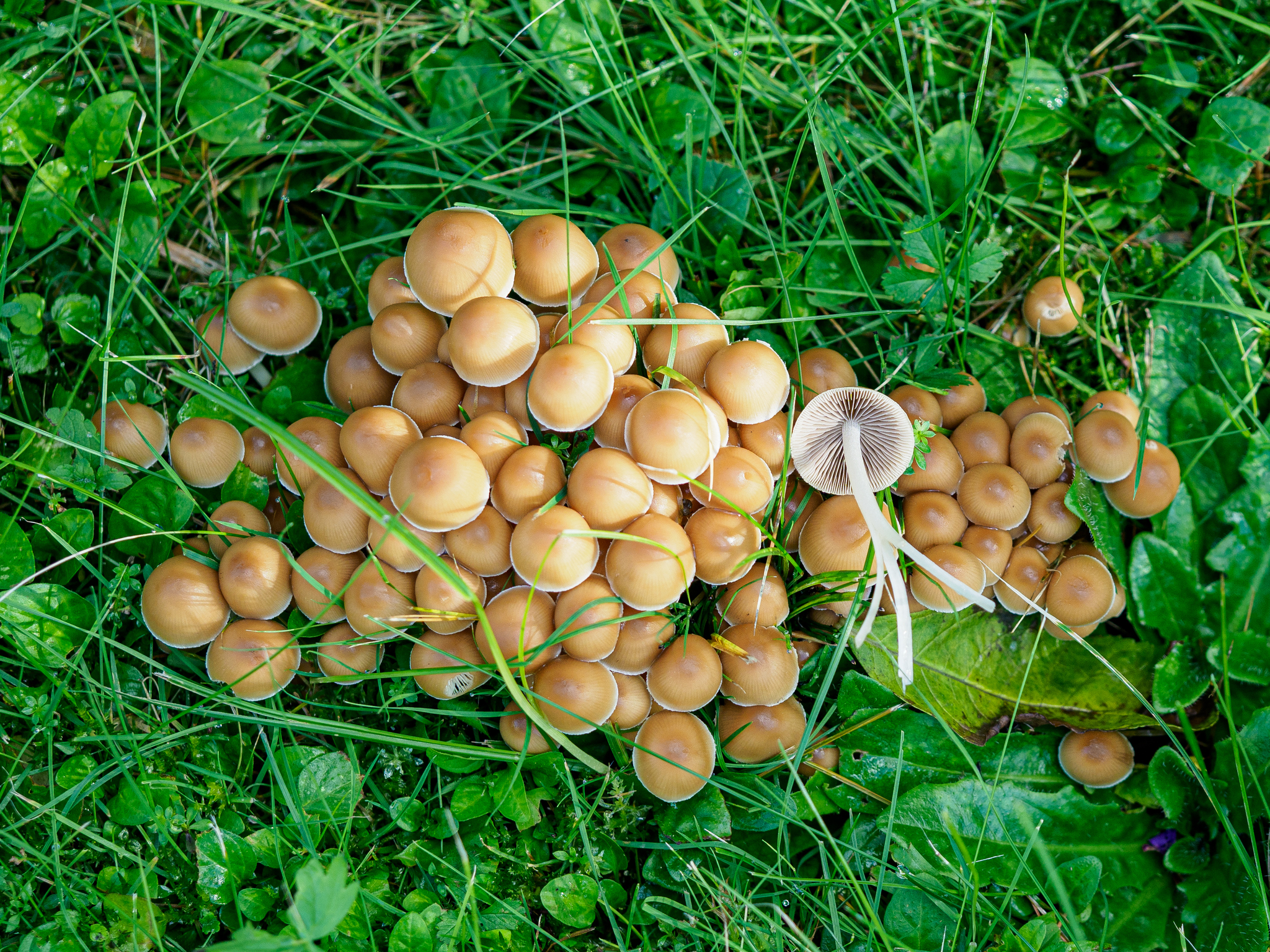
- Britzelmayria multipedata growing in Graz, Austria

Scientific classification
- Domain: Eukaryota
- Kingdom: Fungi
- Division: Basidiomycota
- Class: Agaricomycetes
- Order: Agaricales
- Family: Psathyrellaceae
- Genus: Britzelmayria; D. Wächt & A. Melzer (2020)

Type species
- Britzelmayria supernula (Britzelm.) D. Wächt & A. Melzer (2020)

= Britzelmayria =

Genus of fungi

Britzelmayria is a genus of fungi in the family Psathyrellaceae.

== Taxonomy ==
The Britzelmayria genus was created in 2020 by the German mycologists Dieter Wächter & Andreas Melzer when the Psathyrellaceae family was subdivided based on phylogenetic analysis. Two members of the Psathyrella genus were reclassified as Britzelmayria.

The type species, Britzelmayria supernula was previously classified as Psathyrella supernula.

== Etymology ==
The genus is named after the German mycologist Max Britzelmayr, who originally classified the type species as Agaricus supernulus in 1883.

== Species ==
- Britzelmayria multipedata
- Britzelmayria supernula
