= Charles S. Parker =

American botanist and academic (1882–1950)

Charles Stewart Parker
- Born: March 31, 1882; Corinne, Utah, U.S.
- Died: January 10, 1950 (aged 67); Seattle, Washington
- Other name: Chas. S. Parker
- Education: Pennsylvania State College
- Scientific career
- Fields: Botany; mycology
- Workplaces: Howard University
- Thesis: (1932)
- Doctoral advisor: Lee Oras Overholts
- Author abbrev. (botany): C.S.Parker

Charles Stewart Parker (1882–1950) was head of the Department of Botany at Howard University (1932 to 1948). He carried out the first systematic study of American species of the fungal genus Hypholoma and also collected over 2000 plant specimens, including several new species.

== Personal life and education ==
Parker was born March 31, 1882, in Corinne, Utah, but grew up in West Central, Spokane, Washington, USA. His father was a barber and the founder and publisher of a local newspaper, The Citizen. He attended South Central High School in Spokane, and then Trinity College, Oakland and Washington State College. He taught at the Booker T Washington Institute.

During the First World War, Parker joined the US Army and was commissioned as lieutenant. He served in Europe for over 10 months, including Germany after it surrendered.

He gained BS (1923) and MS (1929) degrees in botany from the department of plant pathology at State College, Washington.

In 1932 he received his Ph.D. in plant pathology from Pennsylvania State College working with Lee Oras Overholts and he then taught in several high schools and colleges.

He was married. He died January 10, 1950, in Seattle, Washington, aged 68.

== Career ==
From 1923 to 1924, Parker was employed by the US Bureau of Plant Industry as a plant pathologist in the Western District of North Carolina. He was appointed to Howard University in 1931 and from 1932 to 1948 he was Head of the Department of Botany. He introduced the department's first Masters programme in 1930. Among the students who studied botany at Howard University at this time was Marie Clark Taylor who succeeded him as departmental chair in 1947. In 1933 he joined the American Association of University Professors and he was also a member of the Mycological Society of America.

He retired in June 1947 and was awarded the title of Professor Emeritus.

As a mycologist, he specialised in the taxonomy of the Basidiomycota, especially Hypholoma, where he provided the first systematic treatment of species found in the USA.

In the 1920s and 1930s he collected over 2000 plant specimens from the Washington, Idaho and Mid-Atlantic regions that formed the basis of the herbarium at Howard University, and which is now named after him (Charles S. Parker Herbarium). This included the type specimens of three new species.

The standard author abbreviation C.S.Parker is used to indicate this person as the author when citing a botanical name.

== Publications ==
- Harold St. John and Charles S. Parker (1925) A tetramerous species, section, and subgenus of Carex. American Journal of Botany 12 63–68
- Charles S. Parker (1933) A Taxonomic Study of the Genus Hypholoma in North America. Mycologia 25 160–212

== Awards and honors ==
The flower species Lathryus parkeri (H.St.John) was named after him and subsequently merged into Lathyrus nevadensis var. parkeri. (H.St.John) C.L.Hitchc.
