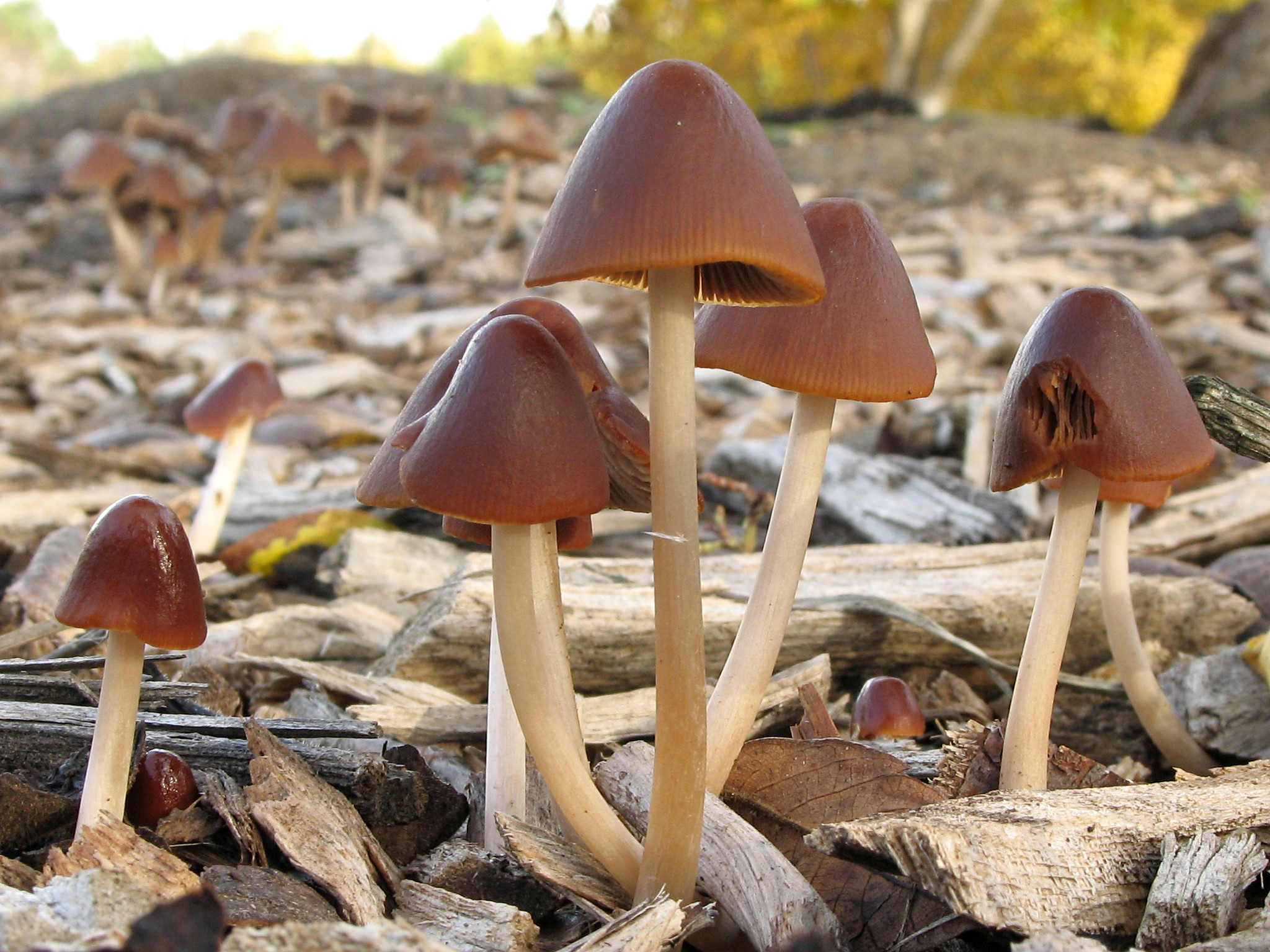

Scientific classification
- Domain: Eukaryota
- Kingdom: Fungi
- Division: Basidiomycota
- Class: Agaricomycetes
- Order: Agaricales
- Family: Psathyrellaceae
- Genus: Psathyrella
- Species: P. atrospora

Binomial name
- Psathyrella atrospora A.H.Sm. (1972)

= Psathyrella atrospora =

Species of fungus

Psathyrella atrospora is a species of mushroom in the family Psathyrellaceae. Found in North America, it was described as new to science in 1972 by mycologist Alexander H. Smith.
