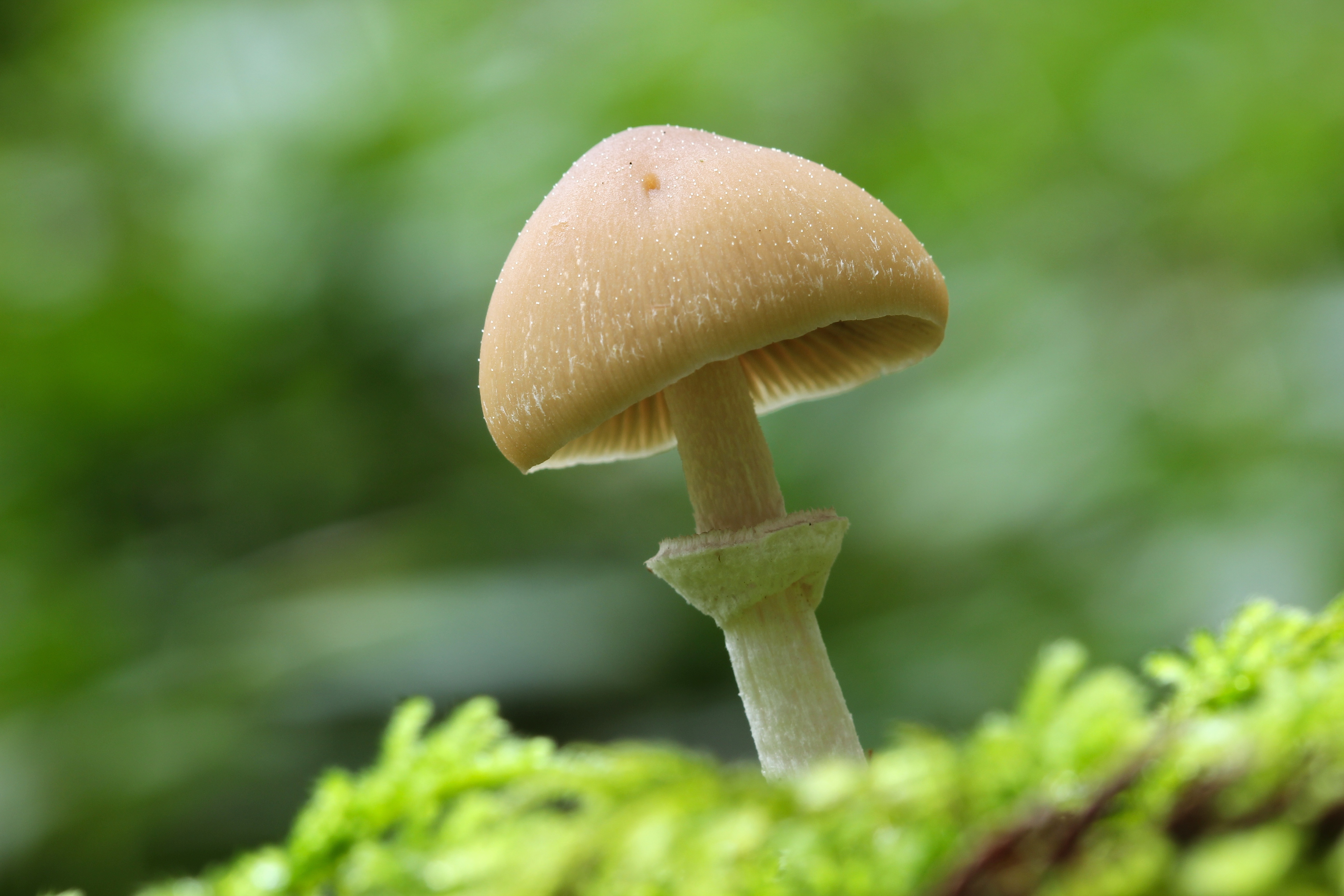

Scientific classification
- Kingdom: Fungi
- Division: Basidiomycota
- Class: Agaricomycetes
- Order: Agaricales
- Family: Psathyrellaceae
- Genus: Psathyrella
- Species: P. longistriata

Binomial name
- Psathyrella longistriata (Murrill) A.H. Sm.

= Psathyrella longistriata =

Species of mushroom

Psathyrella longistriata
- Mycological characteristics
- Gills on hymenium
- Cap is conical or campanulate
- Hymenium is adnexed
- Stipe has a ring
- Spore print is buff to brown
- Ecology is saprotrophic
- Edibility is unknown

Psathyrella longistriata, commonly known as the ringed brittlestem or ringed psathyrella, is a species of mushroom in the family Psathyrellaceae. It is found in the Pacific Northwest.

== Description ==
The cap of Psathyrella longistriata is about 1.7-5 centimeters in diameter. It starts out rounded and conical in shape, before becoming campanulate. Tissue from the partial veil sometimes hangs from the margins. The margin of the cap is striated when moist. These striations usually appear when the mushroom is older. The cap also starts out fibrillose. The stipe is about 3-9 centimeters long and 8-15 millimeters wide. It also has an annulus, which is striated on the top. The gills start out grayish buff in color, becoming darker and browner with age. The spore print is dark purplish brown.

=== Similar species ===
Psathyrella kauffmanii is similar, as it also has an annulus. It is found in eastern North America, as well as the American Southwest and the Rocky Mountains. Psathyrella ellenae var. yubaensis also has an annulus, but it is smaller than P. longistriata and is not fibrillose. Its annulus and cap are also not striated.

== Habitat and ecology ==
Psathyrella longistriata is found in low-elevation forests, where it grows out of rotting wood or leaf litter. It mostly fruits during fall, but occasionally in winter and spring.
